The names of many populated places and geographical features in present-day Turkey have undergone changes over the centuries, and especially since the establishment of the present-day state in the early 20th century, which saw the introduction of an extensive Turkification campaign to change placenames to recognizably Turkish names. The names changed were usually of Armenian, Greek, Georgian, Laz, Bulgarian, Kurdish, Zazaki, Syriac or Arabic origin.

Adana Province
Adana Province: Seyhan
Adana: Adaniya, Adanawa, Adanya, Antiochagaia ad Sarum, Antiocheia i pros Saron, Kuve, Kue, Coa, Atana, Adanos, Ta Adana, Uru Adaniya, Erdene, Edene, Ezene, Batana, Azana, Addane, Antiochia in Cilicia
Yüreğir: Medreseboğazı
Kaşlıca: Nacarlıgemi
Yakapınar: Misis, Missis, IstanbuMopsos, Mopsion, Mopsuestia, Mopsouhestia, Mopsou Estia, Mamista, Manistra, Al Maşşişah, Msis, Mises, Mamestia, Mamuestia, Mamistra, Messis, Decia, Seleucia on the Pyramus, Seleukeia pros ton Pyramon, Seleucia ad Pyramum, Hadriana
Aladağ: Karsantı, Karsandı, Karaköy, Mansurlu, Garsantis, Garsandos, Karsanti, Garsanti
Ceyhan: Yarsuvat, Hamidiye, Yarsuat, Urfiye, Örfiye, Camili, Minareliköy, Yarbisi, Kınık, Kopçak
Yılankale: Levonkla, Kovara, Vaner, Şahmeran kalesi, Şahmaran
Feke: Vahka, Asmaca, Belenköy, Vaka, Vahga
Bahçecik: Pachdzadzouchi, Pachtsetzouki, Pachtsatzikididimü
Gürümze: Kourumza, Curumze, Cürümze, Gurumze, Gariptsas, Garipçetu
Mansurlu: Fkosi
Karaisalı: Çeceli, Midelle, Ceceli
Karataş: Mağarsus, Magarsios, Magarsia, Magarsa, Megarsus, Magarsos, Magorsos, Porto Melon, İskele
Kozan: Sisia, Sision, Sis
Dilekkaya: Anavarza, Ayn Zarba, Ain Zarba, Anázarba, Caesarea ad Anazarbum, Anabarza, Anazarbus, Justinopolis, Anazarbos, Aynızarba
Pozantı: Pendonsis, Pendosis, Pendhòsis, Πενδοσις, Bozantı, Opodandos, Pabando, Padan, Badandun, Padyanda, Padyandus, Podyandos, Παδυανδός, Paduandus, Podandos, Podandus, Πόδανδος, Paduwanda, Potantus, El Bedendum, Eirinopolis, Opodanda, Opodandum, Rhegepodandos, Ῥεγεποδανδός
Saimbeyli: Haçin, Hadjin, Badimon
Tufanbeyli: Höketçe, Mağara
Bozgüney: Kân
Şarköy: Şar, Şarkale, Komana, Comana, Comana Armeniae
Yumurtalık: Ayas, Aiga, Aigias, Aigaies, Aegeae

Adıyaman Province
Adıyaman: Hısnı Mansur, Hısn-ı Mansur, Semsûr, Semsur, Xısn Manṣûr, Harsan Mısur, Hüsnümansur, Perri, Πέρρη
Akpınar: Ağpınar, Garipçik
Bağpınar: Çalgan, Çalxan, Çalkan
Bozhüyük: Bozhöyük
Çaylı: Kakurtlu
Çobandede: İzdik, Çat
Elmacık: Hurraf
Kömür: Komir, Komer
Yaylakonak: Balyan Dağ, Balyan, Balyanlu
Yazıca: Çençen
Yazlık: Kerdiz
Besni: Béhesni, Bêth Hesnê, Beit Hesna, Bahasna, Bet Hesna, Bet Hesne, Behesna, Behesdin, Behisni, Behesne, Bahasna, Bihisni, Besne, Bihişti, Beheşti, Sadr-ı Baz, Ostacuscum
Çakırhüyük: Keysun, Beysun, Geysun, Kaysum, Kayşum, Kaysun, Kaisou, Kêsûn, Kişum, Cesum, Kaeasun, Kaesoun, Keasun, Gison, Kessounion
Şambayat: Şam Bayadı, Şam Beyadi
Çelikhan: Komişir
Gerger: Aldûş, Gargar, Arsemia, Arsameia, Arsamea
Çifthisar: Merdis, Mirdis, Merdişô
Eskikent: Taraksu, Temsiyas
Konacık: Bibol, Bibal, Beybol, Biyol, Bêth Bola, Bêth Bûla
Oymaklı: Gerger, Nefsi Gerger, Gargar', Karkaron
Gölbaşı: Karaçalık, Sergol, Serê Golê, Serêgolê, Bayamlık
Belören: Belviran
Harmanlı: Perveri, Parvalı, Pavralı, Karye-i Pervari, Pervarî
Kalemkaş: Küçük Perveri
Örenli: Pirin, Perrê
Yeşilova İnekli, Adata, Adatha, Al-Hadas, Hadata, Hadâth, Hades
Yukarıkarakuyu: Hevedi, Hevidi, Hewêdî
Kâhta: Kölik, Kölük, Gaktai, Gakhti
Akıncılar: Tokaris, Toqarîs, Taşili, Taş-İl
Bağbaşı: Pilleş, Pilliş
Damlacık: Alut, Tavsi, Tavusî, Tawsî, Tawisî
Eski Kahta: Arsemeia ad Nymphaios, Arsameia, Arsameia Hierothesion
Teğmenli: Gürgürük, Kergürük, Kergürog
Tütenocak: Barsomik, Barzo, Bersomik
Samsat: Semizata, Samosata, Shamushat, Σαμόσατα, Şamşuata, Şamuşad, Şâmişâd, Şemşiata, Samasota, Samusat, Şimsat, Simisat, Simsat, Sumeysat, Sümeysat, Semiata, Semîsad, Sammusat, Samisat, Kummux, Antiochia in Commagene, Αντιόχεια τῆς Κομμαγηνῆς
Sincik: Sıncık, Yarpuzlu
İnlice: Geller, Arnut, Arnot
Tut: Dut

Afyonkarahisar Province
Afyonkarahisar: Afyon, Karahisar-ı Sahib, Karahisar-ı Devle, Akroynon, Sahipkarahisar, Akrenon, Hapanuwa, Akroinοn, Akronium, Nikopolis, Nicopolis, Kara Hissar, Karahisar, Akroênos, Akroinos, Karahisarısâhib, Afiun Karahissar
Fethibey Corca-i Kebir, Büyük Corca, Büyük Çorca, Çorca, Corca
Nuribey Mıyıl, Mihail
Sadıkbey Corca-i Sagir, Küçük Corca, Küçük Çorca
Bolvadin: Polybotós, Polybotion, Polyboton, Polybotum, Polybotus, Kayster Pedion, Bolybotum
Çay: Ulama, Holmoi, Çay Değirmeni
Çobanlar: Anabura, Anabora, Çobanlar-ı Kebir
Dazkırı: Apa, Bolatlı, Polatlı, Kocaoluk, Tazkırı
Dinar: Gelenya, Kelenia, Kelenya, Kelainai, Apameia, Apemia, Celaenae-Apàmea, Kelaenae-Apameia, Geyikler, Dinias, Dineis, Dinies, Dinias, Diniari, Apemea, Celaenae, Κελαιναί
Emirdağ: Amuriye, Amorium, Amoryum, Amurio, Aura, Amerra, Aziziye, Cırgın, Musluca, Amórion, Ammūriye, Hergen Kale, Muslucalı, Ἀμόριον
Hisar: Hisarcık, Hisarköy, Amorium, Amórion, Amurio, Amûriyye
Hocalar
Çevrepınar Kirter, Krithiári 
Davulga Tavılkı
Örencik Virancık
Yeşilhisar Ahırhisar, Ahurhisar, Diokleía, Dokela, Dioklea, Διόκλεια Φρυγίας, Διόκλεια
İscehisar: Dokimyon, İşsizcekarahisar, İşsüzcekarahisar, Dokímion, Dokímeion, Dokímia, Dokimia Kome, Dokimaion, Docimeium
Kızılören: Kızılviran
Sandıklı: Kusura, Pentapolis, Apameía Kybótos, Apemia Kibatos, Samuka, Apamiya Kiyotos, Apemea Sibote, Apamca Sibotus, Apamiya Kivatos
Çevrepınar: Kirter, Kilter
Emirhisar: Eucarpeia, Eukarpia
Gökçealan, Sandıklı: Mingile, Mingine
Karasandıklı: Bruzus, Broúzos
Koçhisar: Hierapolis
Menteş: Stectorion
Yanıkören: Otrus
Sinanpaşa: Sincanlı, Sıçanlı, Ulusincanlı, Cidyessuz, Küçükhöyük
Sultandağı: İshaklı, Julia, Ipsus
Şuhut: Sinnada, Synnada, Cuhûd, Şuhûd, Yehûd, Cühûd, Çıfıt, Cfut, Cufud

Ağrı Province
Ağrı: Karaköse, Karakilise, Qereys, Karakilisa, Karakise, Karakis, Karakilis, Şorbulak, Vadnazor, Qereks, Sevyekeghetsin, Agıri, Καρμπέρ, Karber
Dumanlı: Mirgezen, Akdana, Gezgez, Gezgezik, Gésgés
Diyadin: Tatyon, Daudyana, Diyaeddin, Dadeon, Tateon, Giyadin, Gihadin, Diadin, Shahapivan
Doğubeyazıt: Daronuk, Dareniç, Bayezid, Taruynk, Daruynk, Darenits, Bazid, Kurdava, Bayazet, Baboynk, Bayazet Hin, Bayazid, Bayazit, Baybonk, Bayezit, Biazit, Duğubayazet, Doğubayazit, Payazit, Payezit, Peyazid, Peyazit, Doğubayazıt, Bayaceto, Bayazıt
Çetenli: Teperiz, Tapariz, Pertaşén
Gürbulak: Gürcübulak, Gürcibulak, Gürcibilak, Gürcübilah
: Suluçem, Mosun, Musun, Dzığug
Eleşkirt: Zedkan, Zeydikan, Zeydekyan, Alaşkert, Aleşkerd, Valeşkerd, Vağarşagerd, Alaşgerd, Eleşkird, Zidlikan, Zedikan, Zedıkan, Zétikan, Elajgır, Elajgir, Zetka, Zedka, Zedika
: Halyaz, Xalyaz, Xaylaz, Haylaz, Daher, Dahar, Dayar, Gayar
Hamur: Hemur, Hevaran, Khamur
Patnos: Badnoc, Patnoc, Panos, Patnots, Badnots, Batnus
: Karakilise
: Sultanmut, Sıltamut, Sultanmud, Sultan Mevt
Taşlıçay: Avkevir, Taşlıçay Süfla, Avekevir
: Üç Kilise, Üçkilise, Bagavan, Bagawan, Pakavan, Avkevir, Deri, Der, Dera, Dera Üçkilise, Nıbad, Nipates
Tutak: Durtak, Entab, Antep, Antap, Andap, Dvaradzadap, İkimahalle, Duthakh, Dutah, Durtah
: Kesan, Kisan, Kesani, Er Geçti
: Elho, Elxo, Sebki

Aksaray Province
Aksaray: Taksará, Taxara, Garsaúra, Gausara, Colonia, Colonia in Cappadocia, Kolônia Arkhelais, Koloneia, Koloneai, Arkhelais, Arkhelaida, Archelaida, Archelais Garsaura, Archelais, Archaleis, Kurşura, Nenessa, Nenaşşa, Nenossos, Aksera, Aksará, Aksari, Axari, Shinakhatum-Shinukhtu
Bağlıkaya: Çimeli Veyisfakılı
Dikmen: Tokariz
Gökçe: Mamasun, Mamaasson, Momoassós
Helvadere: Nora, Mokissós, Viranşehir, Harladere, Halvadara, Justinianopolis, İustinianópolis
Akhan: Coropassus, Koropassós
Topakkaya: Çimeli Uzartık
Tatlıca: Dadasun, Dadassós
Karakova: Hayrat
Babakonağı: Gelesin, Gelesün, Doqî, Doki
Kalebalta: Qeleko, Balta
Akhisar: Ḥiṣn Sinān, Ákra Sínon, Sinon
Yeşilova: Acem, Acemhöyük, Purushanda
Yenikent: Amarat
Yeşiltepe: Kırgıl
Yuva: Dura
Gençosman: Dorukini, Apicem
Nurgöz: Yeniyuva, Nürgüz, Argustana
Koçpınar: Çilhöyük, Sinasa
Bozcatepe: Lefkere
Elmacık: Gine, Kana
Armutlu: Armudlu, Ápion
Karacaören: Salambria, Salamboreia
Ağaçören: Panlı
Oymaağaç: Nitazo
Eskil: Eski İl, Iskil, Esbkeşan, Atçeken, Gâvröreni, Aerioteri
Ortakuyu: Comitanassus
Güneşli: Ubinnaca
Gülağaç: Ağaçlı
Bekarlar: Nenizi, Nazianzus, Nenezios, Nazianz, Nazianzo, Nazianzos, Nenezi, Nadandos, Bekir, Nenaşşa
Sofular: Sorsofu, Sorsovi, Borissós
Pınarbaşı: Geyral
Çatalsu: Absari
Güzelyurt: Gelveri, Gelvere, Karbale, Karbala, Karvali, Karbali
Selime: Sâlamo, Sâlamûn, Salamôn, Salamís
Bozcayurt: Mandama
Sivrihisar: Arianzos
Akyamaç: Genedala, Kanotala, Kanótala
Belisırma: Belisyma, Peristirema, Peristremma, Peristrema
Ihlara: Chlorus, Chlorós, Xliára, Chliará, Ixlara, Peristremmatos, Peristremma, Peristrema, Peristrematos
Ortaköy: Eyübeli, Eyüpili
Pınarbaşı: Nitazo, Nitazi, Nadianulus
Harmandalı: Nyssa
Ozancık: Ersele
Sultanhanı: Sülüklü Höyük

Amasya Province
Amasya: Simre, Amaseia, Amasia, Amassia, Amasiyya, Amaccia, Amacia, Amasea
Doğantepe: Zara
Ormanözü: Mörek
Göynücek: Hakmiş
: Varay
Gümüşhacıköy: Gümüşbazar, Etonia, Kimmari, Artıkova, Artukova, Artıkabat, Artukabat, Artukabad, Gemara, Gemari, Hacı Nazır Köyü, 
Merzifon: Marzban, Marzvan, Merzban, Mersyphòn, Marzifūn, Mersivan, Marsovan, Mersuvan, Merzpond, Marsıvan, Marsvan, Marsevinç, Marsıpıli, Marsipont, Marsivan, Merz-i Van, Merzifounta, Merzifunta
Aktarla: Nor Ani, Nuri Eli, Nureli, Nurani, Nureni
Çaybaşı Löşdiken, Löşdiğin
Karamustafapaşa: Marınca, Mirince, Bahçekent
Suluova: Arguma, Argoma, Ergoma, Erguma, Argouma, Alevi, Ulvi, Xiliokômôn, Suluca
Yolpınar: Hakala, Hağala, Kağala, Kağla, Kaala, Kavala
Taşova: Taşabad, Yemişenbükü
Uluköy: Sonusa, Sonisa

Ankara Province
Ankara: Ankuwa, Amkuwa, Ankuvas, Ankas, Anker, Agheridha, Engürü, Engure, Engüre, Engüri, Enguriye, Engüriye, Engüriyye, Anguri, Angurie, Anguriyye, Angarya, Anhira, Ankira, Ankura, Angura, Angora, Ankyra, Ancyra
Akyurt: Ravlı
Balıkhisar: Balasar
Altındağ
Hacettepe: Keltepe, Hacıtepesi
: Zülfazıl, Zülfazl, Sulfasol, Solfazul, Solfasıl, Sonfasıl, Zül-Fadl
Ulus: Taşhan, Hakimiyet-i Milliye, Ulusal Egemenlik
Ayaş: Ayas, Ayvaz, Ayaz, Agios, Mnizous, Mizzos, Mnizos, Mnêzos, Mnizus, Minizus, Minizos, Μνῆζος, Mizagus, Mizago, 
Gökçebağ: Tiske
Uğurçayırı: Balçiçek, Balçıcak, Mnizous, Mizzos, Mnizos, Mnêzos, Mnizus, Minizus, Minizos, Μνῆζος, Mizagus, Mizago, Rhegemnezus, Rhegemnezos, Ῥεγέμνηζος 
Ulupınar: Melal
Balâ: Bozulus, Yörükan, Tabanlı, Balâhisar
Çankaya: Cankaya, Çengikayası, Çankayası
: Balşehir, Baal-Gat, Balıkat
: Kutugün
: Dodurhan
Yeşilkent: Mühye
Çubuk: Çubukabad
Esenboğa: İsen Buga
Yeşilkent: Ahurlar, Ahur
Elmadağ: Asi Yozgat, Asi Yozgad, Küçük Yozgad
Ediğe: Edige, Hediye
Yeşildere Fatih: Bolecasgus
Etimesgut: Ahimesut, Etimesut, Amaksis, Amaksyz, Amaksuz, Akmasuz, Axi Mes'ut, Ahi Mesud, Etimesud
: Ahi Elvan
Eryaman: Emir Yaman
Gölbaşı: Gölhanı
Oğulbey: Korbeous, Corbeus, Gorbeus
Tulumtaş: Dolundaş, Doluntaş, Toluntaş
Yaylabağ: Bursal
Kazan: Kazğan, Gazan, Kahramankazan
Fethiye: Girindos
Orhaniye: Minaris
Mürted: Akıncı, Murtazaabad
Örencik: Leblebi Örencik
Peçenek: Beçene, Bacanak, Beçe, Beçenek
Yazıbeyli: Halkavun, Halka-Sulu, Halka-Havlu
Keçiören: Kiçiviran, Keçi-viran
: Yavlum, Bavlum
Mamak: Ahi Mamak, Axi Mamak, Agios Mamas, Aya Mama
: Nenek
Pursaklar: Busaklar, Eskiköy, Bursaklar, Pür-saklar, Filsaklar, Pirsaklar
Sincan: Sindana, Sıçan
: İstanos, Stanoz, Stános, Zîr Yenikent, İstanoz, Estanos
Yenimahalle
İvedik: Evedik
Beypazarı: Laganya, Laganya Anastasyopolis, Beğ Bazarı, Beğpazarı, Lagania, Lagania-Anastasiopolis, Germiyan Hezar, Anastasiopolis
Çamlıdere: Kuzviran, Şeyh Ali, Şeyhler
Evren: Çıkınağıl
Güdül
Akçakese: Akçakilise, Akçakise, Akçekese
Kavaközü: Hamidiye, Cimder, Çimder, Çingârlar
Yeşilöz: Keşanoz, Keşönöz, Keşenöz, Keşanos, Keşanuz, Keşanöz, Örenkaşı, Xanos, Keşanus, Örenkaş
Haymana: Haymanateyn, Hayme Ana, Androna
Yurtbeyli: Köse Abdullah
Kalecik: Malós, Acitoriziaco
Yeşilöz: Münkati, Munkatı
Çiftlikköy: Konkarztiakon, Konkarztiakón
Kızılcahamam: Yabanabad, Yabanabat, Çorba
Taşlıca: Taşlı Şeyhler
Nallıhan: Karahisar-ı Nallı
Çayırhan: Gordiou Kome, Iouliopolis, Iulipolis, Iulii, Heliou Polis, Heliopolis
Polatlı: Papyra, Gordium, Górdion, Gordiyon, Poladlar, Poladlı, Yakup Ağa, Γορδιον
Yassıhüyük: Górdion, Gordiyon, Gordium, Yassıhöyük
Yeşilöz: Memela, Memelan, Çamviran, Kokar
Yüzükbaşı: Bagrum
Şereflikoçhisar: Koçhisar, Zu-vinasa, Nenassa, Nenaşşa, Nigdia
Üzengilik: Ozizala, Ozzala
Değirmenyolu: Parlasan, Parnassós, Parnassón
Karamollauşağı: Sadagolthina
Yazısöğüt: Derevenk
Hacıbektaşlı: Corucunta
Gülhüyük: Andraka, Andrapa

Antalya Province
Antalya Province: Pamfilya, Teke
Akseki: Marla, Marulya
Bademli: Bodamya, Potamiá
Gümüşdamla: Zeylan, Zilan
Menteşbey: Gödene, Goden
Alanya: Korakesion, Korakassa, Korakision, Coracesium, Coracecium, Kalonoros, Galonoros, Caloboros, Galanorum, Alâiye, Alâiyye, Alaya, Alaia, Alaiya, Kandelore, Candiloro, Candelor, Candelore, Candelorum, Candelorus, Cendeloros, Candellorum, Centalor, Canderone, Chandeloro, Candebor, Quandelor, Escandelour, Kantiloros, Kardelloro, Scandeloro, Scandiloro, Scandelore, Skandeloros
Emişbeleni: Belen
Konaklı: Şarapsa, Telatiye, Talatiye
Seki: Siedra, Syedra, Σύεδρα
Ulugüney: Alara
Yeşilöz: Domalan
Antalya: Attalya, Antalia, Attalia, Attalea, Adalia, Adalya, Atalya, Satalia, Sattaliya, Ἀττάλεια, Ανταλία
Aksu: Kestros, Kastaraya
Perge: Parha, Perga
Döşemealtı
Selimiye: Karadon
Kepez: Κέπεζ
Varsak: Lyrboton Kome, Örenkale
Konyaaltı: Koyaltı
Demre: Mira, Kale, Eynihal, Myra, Zümrütkaya, Temre
Simena: Kaleköy, Kale
Üçağız: Teimioussa, Tristómo, Tristóme
Elmalı: Emelas, Kabalı, Amelas, Almali, Alymala, Ελμαλί
Finike: Foenikus, Fineka, Fenike
Gazipaşa: Traianapolis, Selene, Sallune, Selinus, Selinti, Selendi, Silinti, Selinos, Selinounta, Traianopolis
Güneyköy: Antiochia Mikra, Antiochia ad Cragum, Antiochetta, Antiochia Parva, Antiocheta, Antiocheta in Rufine
Macarköy: İlisuluk, Ilısuluk
Zeytinada: Seyfe
Gündoğmuş: Eksere
Köprülü: Girenes, Girenas
İbradı: Aydınkent, İvradi, Apratteia, Prakana, Brakena
Başlar: Eynif, Tolhan
: Erimna, Erymna, Orymna, Erymni, Erymne, Erymnai, Ardıçpınar
Ürünlü: Unulla
Kaş: Andifli, Andifili, Antiphellus, Antifellos, Antiphellos, Ezefli, Habessus, Habesos, Habesa
Bezirgan: Pirha
Dereağzı: Mastura, Mastaura, Μάσταυρα
Felen: Felen Yaylası, Phellus
Gelemiş: Kalamís, Kelemiş, Arsinoe, Patara, Pttara, Πάταρα, Ἀρσινόη
Gömbe: Komba
İslamlar: Bodamya
Kalkan: Kalamaki
Sıçakiskelesi: Avasarı, Aperlae, Aperlai, Porto Abrile, Aperrae, Apyrae
Üzümlü: Margaz
Yeşilköy: Fırnaz
Kemer: İdiros, Eski Köy
Çıralı: Himera
Göynük: Gökbük
Tekirova: Faselis
Korkuteli: İstanoz, İsinda, Korkudili
Bayatbademleri: Bademli, Bayatbademler
Bozova: Zivint, Vebre
Büyükköy: Legost, Ali Fahrettin, Alafaradın
Çomaklı: Fığla, Çomaklı Dede
Garipçe: Garipcik, Komabe
Kumluca: Sarıkavak
Adrasan: Çavuşköy, Adrassós
Olimpos: Olympos
Manavgat: Manaua
Altınkaya: Zerk, Selge, Selgi
Bucakşeyhler: Seleukia, Σελεύκεια, Seleukeia, Seleucia
Çamlıtepe: Namaras
Side: Selimiye, Eski Antalya, Eski Adalya
Yaylaalan: Avasun, Avason, Ayvasin
Serik: Silyon, Sillyon, Sylleion, Σύλλειον, Σίλλυον, Syllaeum, Syllaion, Συλλαῖον, Selywiys, Sallawassi
Aşağıkocayatak: Murtana, Murtena, Taife
Belkıs: Aspendus, Aspendos, Estfedus, Azatiwadaya
Gebiz: Macar, Muhacir
Haspınar: Hasgebe, Gebe 
Kozan: Pednelissos, Pednelissus, Petnelissus, Petnelissós, εδνηλισσός

Ardahan Province
Ardahan: Artaani, Artahan, Erdahan, Erdehan
Akyaka: Koduzhara, Kodisxara, Kodishara, Mihailovka, Mixailovka
Sulakyurt: Sarzep, Sarzeb, Sarzab, Yukarı Sarzep, Nikolayevka, Nikolaevka
Tepesuyu Gürcübey
Çıldır: Zurzuna, Zarzini, Çrdilo, Çandır, Husenian, Hiusisean, Çrdili
Meryemköy: Maryam
Damal: Petereke, Kura, Tamal
Göle: Mardenik, Merdenik, Merdenek, Martenik, Merdinik, Kola, Goğa, Ardahan-ı Küçük
Çayırbaşı: Okam
Köprülü: Korehenk, Gorevenk, Korevenk
Meşedibi: Moryofka, Marievka
Hanak: Haçrek, Hacerek
Baştoklu: Yukarı Dikan, Büyük Dikan, Yukarı Tikan, Büyük Tikan
Posof: Digor, Diğor, Duğur, Diguri, Degor, Poshov, Boshu, Poshev, Posxov, Poskov, Poshof
Kolköy: Kuvel, Kvel
Türkgözü: Badele, Badela, Bedile, Badile, Bedel

Artvin Province
Artvin Province: Çoruh, Livane
Ardanuç: Artanudji, Ardenuç, Artanuçi
Anaçlı: Anchis, Ançkora, Ancha
Avcılar: Arkım, Arkim
Bulanık: Yeni Rabat, Eni Rabat, Rabat, Noraşén, Nori, Shatberdi
Tosunlu: Usot, Uşut
Arhavi: Arkabi, Orkhevi, Ark'abi, Arha Viçe (Eski Köy)
Güngören Kapisre, Kapiste, Kapistona
Artvin: Livane, Livana, Lavane, Lawaneh, Artvani, Artavani, Artvini, Ardvin, Art'vani
Bağcılar: Opiza
Bakırköy: Kuvarsan, Kuvarsxan, Kuvarshan, Kovark', Kovars
Hamamlı: Dolishane, Doliskana, Dolisxane, Dolishana, Lodisqana
Kalburlu: İşhabil
Ortaköy: Berta
Oruçlu: Orcuk, Orcik
Pırnallı: Porta, Hanztis, Khandzta
Salkımlı: Tolgum, Tolgom, Talgom
: Sinkot, Sünbüllü
Vezirköy: Vazriya, Vardzia, Vazirya
Zeytinlik: Sirya
Borçka: Soteropolis, Borçishevi, Borçha, Porçka
Camili: Khertvisi, Hertvisi, Hertvis
Düzköy: Çhala, Çxala, Çxalazeni, Cxalet
Güreşen: Pehlivan, Perlevani, Perlavan, Beğlevan
Muratlı: Maradidi, Maradit
Hopa: Anaksupe, Khopa, Xoba, Xupati, Xopa, Cihadiye
Çimenli Ardala
Sugören Kise, Kisse (Kilise)
Kemalpaşa: Makriyali, Makriali, Noğedi, Noghedi, Makrê Aigiálê
Sarp Sarpi, Apsari
Murgul: Damar, Göktaş, Murghuli, Murğuli, Murguli
Akantaş Bucur
Çimenli Kordet, Korideti
Damar İskebi
Şavşat: Shavsheti, Shushad
Meydancık: Diobani
Yusufeli: Pertekrek, Pürtekrek, Perterek, Pertarek, Purtekrek, Peterek, Akhalti, Axalt, Kiskim, Keskim
Altıparmak: Barhal, Parkhali
Çevreli: Pertekrek, Peterek, Pertakrag
Darıca: Tivasor, Tevatsor
Demirkent: Erkinis, Eraxanis, Erk'inisi
İşhan: Ishkani, Ishkhan, İshkhhan, Işhan, Ishkhani
Kılıçkaya: Ersis, Arseats P'or, Arsiani, Arsenênê
Kirazalan: Hers, Hars, Tukharisi
Öğdem: Küşnara, Küşnare, Kvişnara, Ögdem
Özgüven: Gudashev
Tekkale: Dörtkilise, Çordvank, Çordvani, Otxa Eklesia, Otkhta

Aydın Province
Aydın Province: Efeler
Aydın: Tralles, Tralleis, Τραλλεῖς, Caesarea, Güzelhisar, Anthea, Antiochia, Αντιόχεια, Erinina, Erynina, Euanthia, Aidin, Aydın Güzelhisar, Seleucia in Caria, Seleucia ad Maeandrum
Efeler
Dalama: Yeniköy, Ta Loúma
Bozdoğan: Madran, Pazarköy
Akseki: Akçaköy
Amasya: Amasya-i Aydın, Değirmenbükü
Çamlıdere: Cendere
Güvenir: Gögeri
Haydere: Haydara, Βάργασα, Bargasa
Kavaklı: Ayios Konstantinos, Άγιος Κωνσταντίνος, Ayakösten
Kemer: Arapapıştı
Konaklı: Munamak, Monomáxos
Olukbaşı: Biresse, Bir İsa, Birisa, Perasa, Peressa
Örmepınar: Genzile
Örtülü: Dıraboz, Trabulus, Tıraboz, Tripolis
Yenice: Köte
Buharkent: Burhaniye
Çine: Kıroba, Hamidabad, Hamitabad
Doğanyurt: Araphisar, Araphisarı, Alabanda, Αλαβάνδα, Alabandeus, Antiochia of the Chrysaorians
Topçam: Madran
Yolboyu: Genevis, Genevüs
Didim: Didima, Yoranda, Yeronda, Yoran, Hisar, Yenihisar, Didyma, Δίδυμα
Balat: Milet, Miletos, Miletus, Militos, Millawanda, Milawata
Germencik: Değirmencik, İğneabad
Tekin: Magnesia, Magnesia on the Maeander, Magnisia i pros Maiandro, Magnisia i epi Maiandro, Magnesia ad Maeandrum
İncirliova: Karapınar
Karacasu: Yenişehir
Geyre: Yeniköy, Afrodisyas, Ninoe, Stravopolis, Karía
Karpuzlu: Alinda
Koçarlı: Mazun, Kaçkarlı, Göçerler
Akmescit: Karakilise
Boğaziçi: Madrandere
Gaffarlar: Mazin, Mazın, Mazon, Mazun, Amyzon, Amizon
Sobuca: Su Bucağı, Suyüce, Sobice
Köşk: Göçük, Sındaklı, Kiosk
Kuşadası: Skala Nova, Neopolis, Pygela, Nea Efesos, Phygela, Ficila, Fijilah
Davutlar: Türkçanlı, Türkçamlı
Güzelçamlı: Çamlı, Rumçamlısı, Gavurçamlı, Rumçanlısı, Panionion
Soğucak: Anya, Anaia, Kadıkalesi
Kuyucak: Kuyuçok, Antioch, Antiochia, Antioxeía, Ἀντιόχεια τοῦ Μαιάνδρου, Antiochia ad Maeandrum, Pythopolis
Bucakköy: Bucak, Itoana
Çamdibi: Uzgur
Kurtuluş: Bilara, Blara, Billara, Brioula, Brioulla
Pamukören: Gerenis, Gereniz, Gerenezlü
Yukarıyakacık: Yukarı Avra
Nazilli: Pazarköy, Nazlı İli, Nazlı, Mastavra
Bozyurt: Mastura, Mastavra, Mastaura, Μάσταυρα
Söke: Anaya, Annaya, Aneon, Sokya, Sókia, Akçaşehir, Maiandrópolis, Maiandroupolis
Avşar: Myous, Myos, Myus
Doğanbey: Domatca, Domatça, Damatça, Domatya, Domadya, Domatia, Tomadepe, Tomatçe, Tomadçe, Tomanca
Güllübahçe: Piryen, Priene, Prien, Gelebeş, Gelebeç, Kelebéts
Sultanhisar: Nisa, Nýsa, Nyssa, Νύσα, Νύσσα
Salavatlı: Kurucular, Salavatiye, Acharaca, Ἀχάρακα, Charax, Χάραξ
Yenipazar
Donduran: Ortas, Ortasi, Ortasia, Orthosia, Orthasia, Ὀρθωσία

Balıkesir Province
Balıkesir Province: Karesi, Karasi, Misya
Ayvalık: Kidonya, Kidonyes, Ayvalı, Kidonia, Aioliki, Kydonie, Kydona, Kydonies, Kidoniyes, Kidoniai, Ayvali, Aivali, Herakleia, Aioliki, Αϊβαλί
: Ayazmend, Ayazmand, Agiasmáti, Ayazment
: Sarımsaklı, Sarmısaklı, Yanitsari, Genitsarochori, Yeniçarohori, Yeniçeri, Yeniçarohorion, Yeniçeriler
Pateriça: Patriça, Patriçya, Πατερίτσα
: Laka, Lakka, Çamlık, Τσαμλίκ, Λάκκα
Balıkesir: Balak Hisar, Balık Hisar, Paleo Kastro, Palaiokástro, Balikesri, Hadrianoutherai
Balya: Kocagümüş, Palya, Pálaia, Ergasteri, Ergasterya, Ergasteria, Ergasteryon
Bandırma: Panormos, Panderma, Panaromos
: Adrestia, Aydıncık
: Daskyleion, Daskylion, Daskilion, Daskylos, Deskileion, Dascylium, Δασκύλιον, Δασκυλεῖον
Bigadiç: Didi-Moti-He, Achyraus, Akhiraus, Akhyrous, Pegadia, Pegaditis, Pegadítsa, Begadia, Bigadia, Begados, Bigados, Bugadıç, Bugadiç, Boğadıç
Burhaniye: Kemer, Kemerion, Pidasus, Kemer Edremid, Kemer Edremit
Çallı: Alaçalı, Kırlı
Hisarköy: Asar
Kırtık: Kırtıkoba
: Kuzdere
: Karataş, Karatepe, Adramytteion, Adramyttion, Atramytium, Adramyttium, Άδραμύττιον, Άδραμύττειον, Άτραμύττιον
Pelitköy: Pelle, Zeytinpınar, Zeytinpınarı, Pelitkönük, Pelidönü, Pelidiye
Şahinler: Karga, Kargalı 
Taylıeli: Taylı İli
Dursunbey: Balat, Palátion, Belodos, Abriettene, Hadriyanya, Hadriania, Hadrianeia, Adriania
Edremit: Adramityon, Adramut, Adramit, Adramitium, Adramitiyum, Adramyttion, Adramytteion, Adramyttium, Adramiti, Adramys
Akçay: Astira, Astyra
Altınoluk: Papazlık, Antandros, Antandrus, Antandria, Ἀντανδρία, Ἄντανδρος
: Aspaneus
Erdek Artake, Arteka, Nova Justiniana, Artas, Αρτάκη
: Katô Neoxôrion, Neocreo, Neokreo
: Kocaburgaz, Kocabergos, Korucabergos, Lángas, Langáda
: Kizikos, Cyzicus, Kyzikos, Yeniköy, Balkız
Çakıl: Çakılköy, Mihanya, Mixanya, Mikhaniona, Mêxaniôna, Muaniya
: Şahinburgaz, Şahinbergos, Şamburgaz, Diavati, Diavathy
: Kukaro
: Dragonda, Drakoúnta
İlhan: İlhanlar, İlhanköy, Erek, Herek, Haraki, Xaráki
: Perama, Pereme, Perema, Peramo, Preme, Péramos
: Kestel, Kastélli
Kurbağalı: Kanava
: Rodya, Rutya, Rhóda, Trodo, Ρόδα
: Konya, Gonya, Gôniá
: Şeytanköy, Şeytanlı, Kataboz, Katátopos
: Ermeniköyü, Kumliman, Kum Limanı, Kumlulimanı
: Fatya, Fatia, Vathy, Vathi, Vathiá
: Anô Neoxôrion, Yapağıcı
Gömeç: Armutova, Kistene, Passavanda, Kisthene, Cisthène, Passandra
Gönen Artemea, Asepsus, Kavana, Germanon, Giunan, Gunan, Günan, Thermi, Granikaion Hamamları, Aesepus
: Zeleya, Zeleia, Ζέλεια
Havran: Aurelin, Viraneli, Aureliane, Aureliopolis
İvrindi: Aya Rindi, Avrandi, Abrettênê, Evritini
: Pioniai, Pionia, Pionia Mysias, Hierokles Pionia, Πιονία, Πιονίαι
Kepsut: Hadrian-ot Hera, Adriyanatere, Hadrianutherai, Hadrianotherae, Akhiraus, Kesbit, Kevkebisut, Kepsüt
Manyas: Poimanon
: Eski Kazaklar, Kazaklar
: Pemaninos, Pemaninum, Eski Manyas, Poemanenum
Marmara: Prokonessos, Marmaron
Avşa Island: Türkeli, Afisia, Aphousia, Ophiousa, Αφησιά, Οφιούσα
Yiğitler: Araplar
Ekinlik Island: Kutali, Akanthos, Κούταλη
Marmara Island: Prokonnesos, Proikónnêsos, Proikonesos, Proconnesus, Proeconesus, Adelfonisos, Elaphónêsos, Marmarás, Marmarónêsos, Προικόνησος, Προκόννησος, Αδελφόνησος, Μαρμαρά
: Aftoni, Aftonya, Afthoni, Afthónê, Aphthoni, Aphthonia, Αφθόνη
Bedalan: Petalan, Petáli
Çınarlı: Kalemi, Galimi, Gallimê, Gallînolimenas, Γαλιμή
: Kızılcık, Prastós, Prasteío, Midillu, Πράστειο
Marmara: Minareliköy, Minareli
Saraylar: Palatya, Palátia, Néa Prokónnêsos, Nea Prokonnesis, Παλάτια
: Kılazak, Klazáki, Κλαζάκι
Paşalimanı Island: Haloni, Αλώνη
Balıklı: Uskopya, Skupia, Scupia, Skopiá
Harmanlı: Halonia, Avlonya, Alônê, Alony, Aloni, Haloni
Paşalimanı: Aloni, Aloniso, Alônê, Alônêssos, Halônê
Poyrazlı: Vori, Voriá, Vory
Tuzla: Huhla, Hühla, Huhliya, Huhlia, Hohliya, Khoukhlia, Chouchlia, Xoxliya, Aigikórai, Χουχλιά
Savaştepe: Kilesun, Kerasia, Kirasoun, Giresin, Giresun
Sındırgı: Koruköy, Karsea, Sandarake
Susurluk: Susığırlık, Firt, Fırt, Fırt ma‘a Şamlı, Susigirlik, Susughirli, Susugurlu, Susırlığı, Sousourlou, Susurlu

Bartın Province
Amasra: Amastris, Amastridos, Sesamus, Sisamos, Amastri, Sesamos
Bartın: Parthenios, Parthenia, Parthenius, Parthenion
Arıt: Erythinoi
Hasankadı: Günye
Kozcağız: Kocanaz, Ahmetler
Kurucaşile: Cromna, Kromna
Ulus: Olous, Ωλους

Batman Province
Batman: Elih, Elah, İluh
Beşiri: Kubin
Bahçeli: Barinç
Beşpınar: Rıdvan, Arans
Gercüş: Kercos, Kfer Cevz, Şupriya, Kercevs, Kfargawso
Hasankeyf: Ilanşura, Cepha, Cephe, Ciphas, Kiphas, Kifas, Kifos, Heskif, Harsenkev, Xisna d'Kepha, Hisno d'Kifo, Heşn Kayfa, Hisn Kayf, Hisn Kaifa, Hisn Kayfa, Hişn Kaifa, Hişn Kayfa, Hişn Kifa, Husn Kayfa, Hassan-Keyf, Hosnkeif, Husunkeif, Hısnı Keyf, Hısnı Keyfa
Kozluk: Hazzo, Hazo, Hezo, Haso
Tuzlagözü: Melefan, Melevan
Sason: Sasun, Kabilceviz, Kabilcevz, Kabu'l-Cevz

Bayburt Province
Aydıntepe: Hart, Xart, Ğarti, Garti
Sorkunlu Toronsos, Toransos
Yazlık: Livera
Bayburt: Paipert, Paypert, Paydpert, Baydbert, Baiberdon, Baibourt, Baiburti, Papert, Baberc, Baybert, Ambatavan, Baberd, Baiburti, Bayberd, Bayburd, Smpadapert
Çayıryolu: Sünür, Sinür, Sinora, Synoria
Örence: Örek, Everek, Averag
Demirözü: Kısanta, K'sant'a, K'sant'ats
Gökçedere: Pülür, Pulur, Plur

Bilecik Province
Bilecik Province: Ertuğrul
Bilecik: Bilekoma, Belokomis, Belekoma, Belekona, Belokome, Belokomi, Vilegüme, Veligöme, Linoë, Agrillion, Agrilion, Bilecük
Bozüyük: Lamunia
Cihangazi: Yeşildağ
Dodurga: Toturga, Totruga, Dudriaga
Gölpazarı: Resulşel, Dönen, Akçaova, Akçaoba
İnhisar
Harman: Harmanköy, Harmankaya, Priminos, Hadrianoi
Hisarcık: Asarcık
Tarpak: Tarbag
Osmaneli: Lefke, Lefkes, Leukai, Leuca, Mela, Gallos, Melevana, Melagina, Malagina
Pazaryeri: Armenokastron, Ermenipazarı, Ermeni Derbendi, Ermeni Pazarı, Pazarcık
Söğüt: Thebasion, Sebasiyon, Beğ Söğüdü, Beğsöğüdü, Söğüd, Sivad
Geçitli: Katlıç, Gordoserba, Gordos, Gordoservon
Yakacık: Esri, Esiri
Yenipazar: Kırka

Bingöl Province
Bingöl Province: Çapakçur
Adaklı: Azakpert, Azaxpert, Azarpert, Azapirt, Asdğapert, Asdğagpert, Asdğapert
Güngörsün: Hösnek, Osnak, Adaklı
Bingöl: Çapakçur, Çabakçor, Çevlik, Çovlik, Romanoupolis, Çevlig, Çolig, Çebekçur, Çolik, Chabakchur, Çabakçur, Çabağçur, Çapağcur, Gelik, Gernik, Çapağ, Çapağa Cur, Çapığcur, Çapak Çur, Cabağcur, Tşapahjur
Ağaçeli: Perhengök-ü Süfla, Aşağı Perhenguk
Akdurmuş: Güldar, Gülzar, Guldar
: Yukarı Perhenguk, Parmuk
Genç: Dara Heni, Dara Hene, Dara Yeni
: Valir, Valér, Söğütlü
Karlıova: Kanireş, Kaniya Reş
Göynük: Eğnud, Eğants Pert, Oğnut
Kaynarpınar: Liçik, Lcig
Kiğı: Gehi, Keyaha, Geğiye, Keği, Kıği, Akiı, Keifi
Solhan: Bongilan, Solahan, Boglon, Beglon, Boglan, Boğilan
: Serban, Serbon
: Ginc, Genc
: Arduşen, Arduşin, Arçin
Yayladere: Holhol, Horhol
Yedisu: Çerme, Çermik, Çerme-i Endiris, Çerme-i Endires, Artaleson

Bitlis Province
Bitlis Province: Pağeş
Adilcevaz: Elcevaz, Artske, Ardske, Artsike, Ardzgue, Ardzge, Arcigeh, Zatülcevz, Elciğaz, Elceviz, Vadi el Cevz, Zal el-Cevz
Ahlat: Khlat, Khlati, Akhlat, Helat, Halads, Şaleat, Kelath, Hilat, Chliat
: Mesik, Mêzik, Medzk'
Bitlis: Bidlis, Bagesh, Bedlis, Baghesh, Paghesh, Bet Dlis, Pagh Esh, Bıdlis, Bağeş, Bağağeş, Pağeş, Zûlqarneyn, Balales, Βαλαλης
: Por, Bor
: Simek
: Şetek, Duxan, Duhan
Güroymak: Norşin, Norshen, Nurşin, Çukur, Norşen, Norashen, Noraşen
Hizan: Khizan, Hayzan, Khizane, Vestan, Erzent
: Hakif, Xakif, Xakiv, Şiréz, Şéntsor, Kurti
: Nors, Kepirli
Sürücüler: Uçum, İspayert, Ispayert, Spayert, Spayerd, İsparyete, Espayrid, Espayrit, Esbaberd, İspayrid, Asiyab-Rud, Sbargerd, İpayran, İsparan, İspandan
Mutki: Motki, Motkan, Miritağ, Mérét'ağ, Miritak
Açıkalan: Misi, Medzi Küğ, Mıtsu
Akçaağaç: Destesorik
Akıncı: Batılmis
Çiğdemalan: İğik
Erler: Havarik, Xavarik
İkizler: Kizank, Gitsank'
Kavakbaşı: Huyut, Xuyut, Xuyt', Dap, Xothaitai
Tatvan: Tetvan, Datvan, Tuğ, Tuğtevan, Tadvan
: Kirtvan, Kırdivan, Garcgan, Gardjgan, Kerdigan, Kercigan, Karçikanare, Karçikan, Karcikan, Karçigan, Karçıkan, Kardigan, Gentrants, Kindiranıs, Kindirans, Kindartz, Kinderantz
Göllü: Ağakis, Ağakiş, Yeğekis, Ağküs, Agakis
Küçüksu: Kotum, Godom, Güzeldere, Aznvats Çur

Bolu Province
Bolu Province: Bebrikya, Honorias
Bolu: Bithynion, Bithynium, Bythinion, Bythinium, Claudiopolis, Klaudioupoli, Claudio Polis, Hadrionapolis, Polis, Poli, Boli, Bolou, Bol Uluğ
Gerede: Cratia, Krateia, Flaviopolis, Cressa, Kratia, Geradiboli
Aydınlar Akçakise, Akçakilise
Beşkonak Mirce Sopran, Mircesopran, Mirce Zobran, Mircezobran
Çukurca Oyukdivan
Dursunfakı Alman
Ertuğrulköy Tekfur
Yeşilvadi Kurin, Kuruin, Guruyin, Soğukoluk
Göynük: Dadastan, Koinon Gallicanon, Kainon Gallicanon
Kıbrıscık: Kyberis
Mudurnu: Modrene, Modirini
Seben: Çeharşenbe, Çarşamba
Yeniçağa: Reşadiye

Burdur Province
Ağlasun: Agalassós, Sagalassos, Salawassa, Belönü
Altınyayla: Dirmil, Trimili, Dirmilcik, Térmilai, Trímilai 
Bucak: Oğuzhan
Çamlık: Girme, Germe, Krémna, Cremna, Κρῆμνα
Kızılkaya: Kratopolis
Kocaaliler: Melli, Milli, Milyos, Milyás, Milias, Mylios
Burdur: Praetoria, Praitória, Polydôrion, Limnombria, Buldur, Limovrama
Çavdır: Çavuldur
: Dengere
Gölhisar: Kibyra, Cbyra, Horzum, Sinda
Kemer: Bebekler, Böbekler, Kemerihamid, Sertaç
Tefenni: İstefani, Tebenna, Stephane, Daphne
Yeşilova: Erle, İrle, Irla, Yavuce, Satırlar, Chairepapa
: Yarayışlı, Asar, Tachina

Bursa Province
Bursa Province: Hüdavendigâr
Bursa: Prusias, Prusa, Prussa, Brusa, Brussa, Brousse, Prousa, Prusa ad Olympum, Hüdavendigar, Prusia
Gemlik: Kios, Cius, Syrus, Prusias ad Mare, Khios, Prousias ad Mare, Prusa ad Mare
: Angaros, Enguri, Engürücek
Gürsu: Susığırlık
Kestel: Kastel, Kástellos
Erdoğan: Dimboz, Dinboz, Denboz, Dimbos
Mudanya: Myrlea, Montania, Moudania, Mudania, Apamea Myrlea, Mirleia, Apameia, Apamea, Brylleion, Myrleia, Montaneia, Mygdonia, Μυγδονία
: Misebolu, Mysópolis, Mesopoli, Misopoli, Μεσόπολη
: Chairesu, Chaiersu, Çarşan
: Veletler, Veledler
Dereköy: Potamia
: Eşkel, Daskyleíon, Daskyleum, Dascilium, Daskylion, Dasklyon, Dasklium
Güzelyalı: Eskiburgaz, Eski Burgaz, Eski Burgos, Pyrgos
: Direkli, Frenkli
: Kızılköy
: Siği, Sygi, Syge
: Sarıgazi
Tirilye: Zeytinbağı, Triglia, Brylleion, Trilye, Tereia, Mahmutşevketpaşa, Trigleia, Triglie
: Γιαλί-Τσιφλίκ
: Bacala, Balaca
: Yörüklü
Nilüfer
: Çatalhan, Çatal Han, Konstanitzi, Ainatos, Konstans
: Anahor, Anaxor, Çağalu, Çağlu
: Fazıllı, Mühle
Gölyazı: Apolyont, Apolonya, Apolonyatis, Apoloni, Apollonias, Apolloniada, Apolloniadas, Apollonia epi Ryndakos, Apolloniatis, Apolloniadis, Apollania, Apollonia ad Ryndacum, Abulyond, Abolyond, Theotokia, Theotokhia, Apollonia ad Rhyndacum, Apollonia
Görükle: Koubouklia, Kouvoukleia, Kuvukliya, Yörük Köyü, Korunaklı, Görüklü, Kouboukleis, Caesareia Germanica
: Misi, Misipolis, Misapoli, Messon, Missi
: Zırafta, Zirafta
Özlüce: İnesi, Eğnesil, İnegazi
Ürünlü: Kite, Kitai, Kete, Katoikia
Osmangazi: Osman Gazi
: Pythia
: Filader, Fledar, Filadar, Phladarie, Filandon, Peladarion, Paladari
: Fomara
Yunuseli: Bilad-ı Yunus, Biladıyunus, Baladyanos, Palatianós, Bidnos, Bedenos
Yıldırım
Büyükorhan: Orhan-ı Kebir
Harmancık: Çardı
İnegöl: İnek Göl, İğne Göl, Eyne Göli, Angelocoma, Angelokoma, Ankedoma, Anglecoma, Eyinegöl, Eyine Gölü, Angelokome
: Kolaca, Kolca, Kulacahisar
İznik: Nicaea, Nikaia, Nikea, Nikaea, Nikaya, Helikare, Antigoneia, Ancore, Ankori, Helicore, Elikori
: Miskoura, Müşküre, Muradiye
Karacabey: Mihalıç, Miletopolis, Mihaliç
: Gilyos
: Kemeryent, Kemeryend, Ágia Kyriakí
: Toyhisar
: Ulubat, Lopadion, Lopardion, Lupadium, Kalopatra Purgaz, Kleopatra Burgaz, Ilı Bat, Ilıbat
Keles: Cebel, Cebel-i Cedîd, Kleos, Kilos, Keles-i Cedid, Kilise-i Cedid, Kelles, Kellia
: Belenviran, Hereke, Heracles
Mustafakemalpaşa: Kirmasti, Kirmastı, Kırmasti, Germa in Hellesponto, Germaslu, Girmas, Kremaste, Kremasti, Kirmasius
Orhaneli: Atranos, Adırnaz, Adranos, Adrianos, Beyce, Orhanili, Orhan İli, Hadrianoi, Hadrianea, Hadrianus ad Olympum, Hadrianea ad Olympum, Adrianoi, Adriani, Adraneia, Hadriani
Orhangazi: Pazarköy
: Basilinopolis
Sölöz: Pythopolis
Yenişehir: Otroea, Atroa, Melangeia, Malágina
Cihadiye Karakilise, Kara Kilise, Kurtköy
Çayırlı Okuf, Vakıf
Çiçeközü Lümbe, Lumbe, Ulumbey
: Köyünhisar, Hamidiye, Bafeus, Baphaeon
Yazılı Sekeri, Zekeriya
Yıldırım Kadıkalktı
Yolören Mekirköy, Mekri, Meğri, Makri

Çanakkale Province
Asian Part of Çanakkale Biga Yarımadası, Troad
Ayvacık Kızılcatula, Ayvalıoba
Behramkale Behram, Assos, Ἄσσος, Assus, Apollonia, Ἀπολλωνία
Gülpınar Külahlı, Hamaxitus,  Hamaxitia, Hamaxitos, Harmatus, Harmatunte, Ἁμαξιτία
Kozlu Lamponia, Lamponion, Lamponeia
Kösedere Larisaia, Larisa, Larissa, Limantepe, Limantepe Larisa'sı
Küçükkuyu Gargaron, Gargara, Gargar, Gargaros
Nusratlı Palaigargaros, Paleo Gargaron, Paleo Gargara, Mısırat Pınarı, Mısıratlı Oba, Mısıratlı, Musuratlı
Bayramiç Kebren, Kebrene, Kebrana, Ebrana, Ebrama, Ebramitis, Ebramiç
Çalıdağı Çaldağ, Kebren, Kebrene, Kebrana, Ebrana, Ebrama, Ebramitis, Ebramiç
Karıncalı Gergis
Kurşunlu Kurşunlutepe, Scepsis, Skapsion, Skepsion, Skepsis, Σκέψις
Tongurlu Töngürlü, Palea Skepsis, Küçük İkizce, Ekizce, İkizce, İkizce Tepe, Eski İkizce, Eski Skisepje, Eski Skepsis, Palaiskipsis, Palai Skepsis, Palaiskepsis
Biga Pegeya, Pegaea, Pegae, Pegai, Pege, Pigas
Gündoğdu Fevziye, Karantı
Karabiga Karabuga, Kara Biga, Kalo Piga, Bay Boğa, Buğa, Priapos, Ali, Periyapos, Baris, Baris in Hellesponto, Πρίαπος
Kemer Kamares, Virancahisar, Paryum, Parion, Paryon, Parium
Çan Gergithes, Gergisler, Etili
Çanakkale Dardanus, Dardania, Dardanel, Dardanium, Dardanellia, Kale-i Sultaniye, Kale Sultanie, Sultaniye Kalesi, Çanak Kalesi
Erenköy Ofrinio, Renkioi, İntepe
Hisarlık Truva, Troya, İlium, İliyon, Ilium, Ilion, Ilios, Troy, Wilusha, Wilusa, Ilusa, Ilouza, Truwisha, Wilion, Vilusa, Truvisa, Troia, Tevfikiye, Hisarlik, Hissarlik
Ezine Azine, İğne, Neandria, Ezne-Enay
Bahçeli Bağçeli, Karaev, Cocylium, Kokylion, Cocyllum
Kayacık Çığrı, Neandria
Uluköy Kestanbol, Kestanebol, Eski İstanbul, Palaía Konstantinoupolis, Eski Stambul, Alexandria Troas, Alexandreia Troas, Troad Alexandria, Indicaia Troas, Antigoneia de Troade, Αλεξάνδρεια Τρωάς
Lapseki Lampsakos, Lampsacus, Pityausa, Lampseke, Löpseki, Lampesak, Pityusa, Pityussa, Πιτυούσα, Πιτυούσσα, Λάμψακος
Güreci Görece
Nusretiye Urumçe
Umurbey Bergos, Bergoz, Bergas, Perkote, Perkosios, Perkot, Purgaz, Bergaz
Yenice İnceköy
Engeci Engece, Kayatepe, Avunyakapı
Gündoğdu Alakilise, Alakese, Alakise
Kalkım Agonia, Agonya, Ağunya, Agunya, Avunya, Ageanoi, Naipli, Αγονια
Nevruz Mavruz
Pazarköy Argirya, Argiza, Arjiza, Arkiria, Argyria
European Part of Çanakkale Gelibolu Yarımadası, Thracian Chersonese, Thrakike Chersonesos, Chersonesus Thracica, Gallipoli
Eceabat Maydos, Madytos, Maitos, Madyta
Akbaş Sestus, Sestos
Alçıtepe Kirte, Kritya, Krithia
Bigalı Idaion
Conkbayırı Çanak Bayır, Chunuk Bair
Kabatepe Gaba Tepe, Καμπάτεπε
Kanlısırt Lone Pine
Kilitbahir Kilit-ül-Bahr, Kynossema, Kilid-ül Bahr, Burceyn Kalesi
Gelibolu Gallipoli, Kallipolis, Kalipolis
Bolayır Plagiari, Πλαγιάρι
Çimpe Çimbi, Çimpi, Cinbi, Çinpi, Tsympe, Tzympe, Τζύμπη
Sütlüce İnceliman, Galata, Aegospotami, Aegospotamos, Aigos-Potamoi, Cumalıdere
North Aegean Islands (Turkish Part) Boğazönü Adaları, Porthmos
Bozcaada Tenedos, Leukophrys
Bozcaada Castle Mamaça Kalesi
Gökçeada İmroz, Imbros
Araşya Hill Arasia, Arassia, Αρασιά
Ayadimitri Hill Ayadimitri Tepesi, Aya Dimitri, Aya Dimitris, Agios Dimitrios, Άγιος Δημήτριος
Aydıncık Kefaloz, Kefalos, Kephalos, Κέφαλος
Bademli Giliki, Gliki, Glyky, Glykí, Γλυκύ, Γλυκί
Cape İnce Burun Avlaka, İnceburun, İncir Burnu, Anthrakos, Αύλακα, Αυλάκι, Άνθρακος
Çınarlı Panaye, Panaghia, Panagia, Panayia, Panagía Palomeni, Panagía Balôméni, Παναγιά
Dereköy İskinit, Kala-i İskinit, İskinet, Sinudi, Shinudi, Skinudi, Schinoudi, Schinudi, Sxoinoúdi, Skhinoudi, Σχοινούδι
Doruk Hill Doruk Tepe, Aya İlya, Agios Ilios
Eskikale Eski Kale, Eski Tepe, Paleokastro, Palaikastro, Παλαιόκαστρο
Eşelek Eselek, Έσελεκ
Gizli Liman Kaçakliman
Kaleköy Kal'a, Kástro, Kástro tis Imbrou, Balabanlı, Balabanlu, Balyanbolu, Palaiopolis, İskiter, Kala-i İmroz, Κάστρο
Kapıkaya Στενός
Kokina Kokkina, Κόκκινα
Kuzulimanı Aya Kiraki, Agios Kirikos, Agios Kyrikos, Άγιος Κήρυκος, Άγιος Κήρυκας
Laz Inlet Laz Koyu, Sinapida, Συναπίδα
Marmaros Katarti, Μάρμαρος, Κατάρτι
Kaşkaval Rockies Peynir Kayalıkları, Kaşkaval Burnu, Kaskavalia Rocks, Κασκαβάλια, Βράχια Κασκαβάλια
Pınarbaşı Çınaraltı, İspilya, Spilia, Σπηλιά
Roksado Ροξάδο
Şahinkaya Σαχίν-Καγιά
Şirinköy Σιρίν-Κιοϊ
Tepeköy Agritye, Agritiye, Agridya, Agrídia, Ağridia, Αγρίδια
Tuzla Aliki, Αλυκή
Uğurlu Livounia, Makris Gialos, Λιβούνια, Μακρύς Γιαλός, Ουγουρλού
Ulukaya Hill
Yenimahalle Evlambi, Evlampio, Eulámpion, Ευλάμπιο, Άγιος Ευλάμπιος
Yıldız Inlet Yıldız Koyu, Κόλπο του Γιλντίζ
Yuvalı Pirgos, Pirgoz, Pyrgos, Πύργος
Zeytinliköy Ayatodori, Aya Todori, Aya Teodoroi,  Ágii Theódôri, Aghii Teodori, Hagía Théodora, Agios Theodoros, Άγιοι Θεόδωροι, Αγίους Θεοδώρους
Tavşan Islands Mavria, Μαυριά

Çankırı Province
Bayramören Bayram-Virane, Bayramviran
Koçlu Doma, Ágios Thomás
Çankırı Gangra, Gagra, Gangrai, Gangaris, ermanikopolis, Germanicopolis, Germanopolis, Tzungra, Hangara, Çangara, Kandari, Kanghari, Çangırı, Çengiri, Kangri, Kangıri, Kangırı, Kengiri, Kengırı, Changra, Çankıri
Çerkeş Ciharköşe, Çeriçeken, Antinoupolis, Antonipolis
Eldivan Er Divanı, İldivan, Dümelli, Dümeli, Dumlu
Ilgaz Koçhisar, Olgassys, Olgasos, Koçhisar-ı Bala
Kızılırmak Hüseyinli, İnallıballı
Korgun Kargın
Kurşunlu Karacaviran, Anadynata
Çatkese Çatkise, Çatkilise
Dağören Meküren, Mekören, Mekviran
Orta Kâri Pazar, Kara Pazar, Karı Pazarı, Karı-Bazarı, Karıpazarı
Doğanlar Avrateli, Avrat-Eri, Avreten, Avrat-Eli, Avretlü, Avratlu
Kalfat Halfat
Yaylakent Bastak, Basdak, Baştaht
Şabanözü Koru, Koru Pazarı
Gümerdiğin Humar Tigin, Kumar-Digini, Kumar Tigin
Gürpınar Ereğez, Eregez
Yapraklı Tuht, Toht

Çorum Province
Alaca Hüseyinabad
Bayat Claneus, Alagöz
Boğazkale Boğazköy, Hattusa, Hattuşa, Hattuşaş, Hattusha, Hattuş-Karum, Χαττούσα
Çorum Efchaneia, Chorum, Tsoroum, Nikonya, Yankoniye, Cürüm, Çevrim, Ευχάνεια, Euchaneia
Dodurga Totırga
İskilip Antrapa, Iskila, İskila, İşkila, İşkila-bi, Asklepios, Aesculapius, Asklipiion, Asklipieion, Blocium, Bloacium, Iskelib, İskelib, Esculape, Eskülap
Bağözü Itlus, İtlus, İmad, Direklibel
Kargı Blaene
Laçin
Çamlıca Yeniçamlıca, Yeni Çamlıca, Rum, Rumköyü 
Mecitözü Etona, Hacıköyü, Avkat Hacıköyü
Beyözü Euchaitae, Euchaita, Euxaita, Ökheta, Avkat
Oğuzlar Karabörk Divanı, Karaviran, Karaören
Ortaköy 
Osmancık Aflanos, Pimolisene
Sungurlu Budaközü, Kalınsaz
Uğurludağ Kızılören, Urludağ

Denizli Province
Acıpayam Garbipayam, Garbikaraağaç, Hamit Ovası, Asikaraağaç, Asi Karaağaç
Kelekçi Gireniz
Yeşilyuva Kayser, Diokasareia, Diokayseria, Keretapa
Babadağ Kadıköy, Salbacos, Salbakês, Salbakos
Bekirler Trapezapolis, Trapezopolis
Baklan Dedeköy, Lounda, Lakèrion, Λακήριον
Beyağaç Eskere, Skirîtis
Bozkurt Hamidiye, Mahmudiye, Hambat Kırı, Hanabat
Başçeşme Battalçeşme
Yenibağlar Moran
Buldan Tripolis, Boldağ, Boldan, Bulladan, Büldan, Çarşamba
Narlıdere Direbolu, Deribol
Yenicekent Tripolis, Tripolis on the Meander, Tripolitis, Tripolis ad Maeandrum, Tripolis ad Meaendrum, Tripolis of Phrygia, Neapolis, Apollonia, Apollonia ad Maeandrum, Antoninopolis, Yenice, Kaş Yenice
Çal Mosyna, Demirciler, Demirci
Çardak Körin, Avana, Han'i Abad
Beylerli Lampis
Çivril Tribritzi, Tribritze, Cyybrilcimani, Civrici, Çivrici, Tzibritzi
Düzbel Myriokephalon, Miryakefalon, Miryokefalon, Miryakefelon, Myriocephalum
Gümüşsu Homa, Siblia, Sublaion, Xôma
Işıklı Eumania, Eumeneia, Eumenia, Şeyhlü, Şeyhli
Denizli Laodikeia pros tou Lykou, Laodicea on the Lycus, Laodicea ad Lycum, Laodiceia, Laodicea, Laodikeia, Laodikya, Laodicaea, Laodike, Lazkie, Lazikiye, Lazkiye, Ladik, Ladikya, Diospolis, Phoas, Rhodas, Trimitaria, Tunguzlu, Tenguzluk, Tonguzluk, Tenguzlu, Tonguzlu, Tonuzlu, Donguzlu, Donuzlu, Dengizli, Denisli
Merkezefendi
Eskihisar Laodikya
Pamukkale Hieropolis, Hierapolis, Ierapolis Frygias, Akköy, Pamukkale
Honaz Colasia, Colossae, Kolossai, Kolossais, Xollossai, Colossea, Chonae, Chonai, Khonaz, Khonai, Khonae, Khonos, Khones, Honas, Cadmus, Cadmos, Kadmos, Κάδμος
Kale Kale Davaz, Tabai, Tabea, Tabae, Taba, Tabenon, Tabi, Tabas, Tabenon
Çakırbağ Çakırca
Sarayköy Sarıbey, Saray, Ezineabad, Ezine-i Lazkiye, Ezine
Altıntepe Denevre
Beylerbeyi Rumlu
Hisarköy Hisar, Attuda
Serinhisar Kızılhisar, Carystus, Karistos, Karia, Kepez-Yerlikaya, Kızılasar
Tavas Davaz, Yarengüme, Yarangüme
Gümüşdere Muğlasun, Mokolda, Mykalessós, Mokolassós
Kızılca Sebastópolis, Saleia
Medet Apollônía apo Salbakês, Apollonia
Nikfer Konak, Büyükkonak, Nikêphoros, Nikifer
Vakıf Herakleia Salbake, Heraklia, Heraklia Salbakês, Heraklia Salbakou
Yorga Kidrama, Kidramos, Kindrama

Diyarbakır Province
Bismil Basmil, Bistmal, Pis Mil
Çermik Jermuk, Çermug, Aberna, Aberne, Çermuk
Çınar Melkis, Melkiş, Akpınar, Hanakpınar
Çüngüş Çinguş, Şankuş, Çunguş, Çunkuş, Cüngüş, Çınkuş, Cunguş, Şınkuş
Dicle Piran, Idiqlat, Idigna, Piran-Piro
Diyarbakır Diyarbekir, Diyar-ı Bekir, Amed, Amid, Kara Hamid, Kara Amid, Amida, Diyar-ı Bekr, Kara Kale, Omid, Diarbekir, Amit, Emd
Bağlar Rezik
Sur Sür
Güvercinevler Anşah, Anşa, Anşaküğ
Yenişehir Bajare Nu
Eğil Egil, Gel, Aşipalis, Encil, Enigelene, Angl, Angel, Karkatiokert, Arkatiakert, Karkathiokerta, Carcathiocerta
Ergani Osmaniye, Arkni, Argni, Arghni, Arghana, Arkanin, Erkanikana, Erkanina, Urkhana, Aşat, Arsania, Arsina, Arsinia, Arsana, Ergania, Arğıni, Arğanahin
Ortaağaç Male Demo, Maledemo, Malademo, Demoevleri, Demo Evleri
Hani Palimaden, Heni, Hene, Hayni, Hayne
Hazro Tercil, Terçil, Hezro, Hataro, Hızro, Khazru
Kocaköy Karaz
Kulp Pasur, Başkale, Pasor, Qulb, Khalib, Kefrum, Kulpo, Peya Sor
Hamzalı Fırka, Şeyhhamzan, Şeyxhamzan, Şeyh Hamza
Lice Lagga, Laga, Lago, Ilıca
Yünlüce Mlahso, Molla, Melle, Mela
Silvan Miya Farkin, Meyafarikin, Martiropolis, Farkin, Mayperkit, Mifarkat, Np'rkert, Meiafarakin, Mayyafariqin, Meyafarkin, Mayafarkin, Meyyafarkin, Maiferkeyn, Martyropolis, Justiniyanpolis, Silivan, Sophenene, Tigranocerta, Tigranakert, Tigranόkerta, Dikranagerd

Düzce Province
Düzce Province Konuralp
Akçakoca Akçaşehir, Akçaşar, Diapolis
Çilimli Çil’mi, Çilmi, Çilimi, Kokape
Cumayeri Cumaova
Düzce Kieros, Prusias ad Hypium, Prusias pros Hypios, Prusias, Prusyas, Hypios, Hypium, Üskübü, Üskübi, Üsküb, Üsküp, Konropa, Konrapa, Konuralp, Düzpazar, Düzbazar, Düzce Pazar
Gölyaka İmamlar
Gümüşova Kışla, Gümüşabad
Selamlar İbrahimağa
Kaynaşlı 
Yığılca

Edirne Province
Edirne Hadrianoupolis, Hadrianopolis, Adrianoupolis, Adrianoupoli, Adrianopolis, Adrianople, Andrianoupolis, Adrianopol, Andrinople, Drinopole, Drinapoly, Edrenebol, Edrene, Edranos, Jedrene, Odrin, Odris, Odrisia, Odrysa, Odrysia, Odrysos, Odrysus, Uskadama, Uskudama, Uskodama, Uscudama
Karaağaç Orestia, Orestias
Enez Aynos, Ainos, Aenus, Annos, Enus, İnoz, İnöz, Enos, Enoz
Büyükevren Megale Diasórne, Megale Diasorá, Büyükasurin, Yassıören, Evrenkebir
Çandır Ágios Athanásios
Gülçavuş Amygdalina, Amigdalína, Amygdalia
Işıklı Arnavutköy, Arvanítes
Kocaali Ayazma, Agiásma
Küçükevren Mikra Diasorá, Diasoranélla, Yassıevren, Diasorina, Diasorne, Bulgar Köy
Sütçüler Galata, Mahmudiye
Şehitler Apsída, Kemerli
Yenice Mayıstro, Maïstros
Havsa Hosa, Hafse, Hasköy, Havass-ı Mahmudpaşa
İpsala Cypsèle, Kypseli, Cypsela, Kypsela, Kypsele, Kypsala, İptila Sala
Keşan Kesani, Kessani, Kissós, Kissón, Zerlanis, Kırkkirişhan, Topkeşan, Keşişlihan, Keş'an, Qashan
Lalapaşa Lalaşahin Paşa
Hacıdanişment Cöke
Meriç Kavaklı, Kavak, Maritsa, Büyükdoğanca
Süloğlu Asvestochori, Asbestohori, Asbestochori, Süleoğlu
Uzunköprü Cisr-i Ergene, Cisri Ergene, Ceseri Ergene, Ergene, Makrifere, Makre Férai, Makra Gefyra

Elazığ Province
Elazığ Province Mamuret-ül-Aziz, Mamüret-ül Aziz, El Aziz
Ağın Ağin
Yedibağ Paşikli
Alacakaya Guleman, Hulaman
Arıcak Mirvan
Baskil Baskel, Bazkil, Baskıl
Hüyükköy Hüyük, Höyük, Eski Sinan
Koçyolu Atikan
Elazığ Mezre, Mezra, Mamuretülaziz, Mamüret-ül Aziz, Mamuret-ül-Aziz, Elâzîz, El Aziz, Elazık, El Azık, Haraba, Arsamosata, Arşamaşat, Arshamashat
Aydınlar Hedi
Dallıca Üngüzek, Engüzek, Inguzig
Harput Har-pu-ta-va-nas, Har-pu-ta-aş, Ga-ar-ba-ta, Carcathiocerta, Karkathiokerta, Hartabert, Hartabird, Khartabirf, Haratparat, Hısn-ı Ziyad, Hisn Ziyad, Hısn Zait, Hesna de Ziyad, Zaid, Zait, Ziata Castellum, Hasan Ziyad, Kharpot, Kharpote, Khar Bert, Kharpeta, Karpata, Quartapiert, Quart-Piere, Harputaş, Karpert, Kharpert, Kharberd, Karbed, Harberd, Garpert, Harbert, Hoiberd, Harpote, Kharput, Karput, Hayr al-Buyut, Harputauanas, Harpurt, Harpurd, Hartpirt, Hargirt, Harbit, Harbirt, Harbid, Harbut, Herburt, Herbrut, Herput, Herprut, Handzit, Hinzit, İlüsnüziyad, Harpetya, Xarberdon, Hesna'd Ziyâd, Xısnu'l-Ziyâd, Xarpert, Xarteburt, Xarput, Χάρπετε
Şahaplı Seyli
Yalnız Yalavuz
Yukarıbağ Şeyhhacı, Şeyxhacı
Karakoçan Tepe, Dep, Tepeköy, Ohu, Ohi
Keban Gaban
Kovancılar Kovancıyan
Çaybağı Karaçor, Garaçor, Karaçur, Çakçur, Çağatsçur, Çahçur, Çaxçur
Ekinözü Havav, Habab
Muratbağı Gülişger, Gırpo, Güğüşgir, Gülüşgür, Gülüşkür, Gülüşker, Gülüşger, Gülişgerd
Maden Keban Madeni, Erganimadeni, Arğanamaden, Arghana Maden
Palu Palou, Romanopolis, Palo, Pali, Balouos, Sebitaruas, Şebeteria, Balu, Bala, Balahovit, Baliobit, Balovit, Balvahovit, Balves, Balvis, Bulu, Hıromanopolis, Pala, Polis
Sivrice Huh, Hoh, Gola Hezarê, Gula Hazar
Dedeyolu Yukarı Hoh, Yukarı Xox, Veri Xox, Verin Xôk', Kolkhis
Gölcük Dzovk, Dsovk, Şupa, Sophene
Taşlıyayla İringil

Erzincan Province
Çayırlı Mose, Mans, Manse, Monse, Mants
Erzincan Keltzine, Keltzene, Keltzini, Aziris, Eriza, Ezirgan, Erzingan, Erzinjan, Yerznka, Yerzınka, Yerzınga, Yerzinga, Yerznga, Uruşa, Urusa, Erez, Eriza Avan, Erznga
Çağlayan Cencike, Cencige
Çatalarmut Ases, Ésési, İsasi
İliç Liç, Lic, Puşadi, Nahale Zelal
Büyükarmutlu Armudan, Armıdan, Medz Armıdan, Armatana
Kuruçay Çiftlik Viranı
Kemah Camcha, Ani-Kamakh, Kamakh, Gamakh, Gamahha, Kamacha, Kamachon, Kemh, Ani, Daranalis, Theodosiopolis
Bozoğlak İhtik, Ixtik, Uxdig, İxtik
Doğanbeyli Ermelik, Ermenik, Armenig
Konuksever Kamarik
Kemaliye Eğin, Agn, Akn, Egin, Akın
Başpınar Baş Vartenik, Başvartenik, Vartenik'
Harmankaya Abrenk, Abarank', Abrank', Abram, Abrak
Topkapı Ençeti, Ençiti, Encırti, Ançırti
Yıldızlı Hastesi
Otlukbeli Karakulak, Otluk Beli
Refahiye Gercan, Gercanis, Gerjanis, Kercas, Garcgank, Garcgans, Gerjanis
Akarsu Alakilise
Çatalçam Zevker, Zevkar, Sivkar
Tercan Dercan, Terçan, Derksene, Derçan, Derzene, Derksene, Derxene, Mama Hatun, Mamahatun, Mamaxatun
Altunkent Kargın
Başbudak Haçköy
Çadırkaya Bagariç, Bagayariç, Bagarinc, Pakayariç, Pakariç, Pekeriç, Bogariç, Bogaridi, Bagarich, Bagayarich
Güzbulak Pelegoz
Ortaköy Tivnik, Tvnig, Dvnig, Dubina
Yollarüstü Vican, Vjan
Üzümlü Cimin, Cimni, Tsimin, Çimin, Çırmes, Tsoumina
Ocakbaşı Selepür, Tanyeri, Suru, Gome Suru,  Zurén, Surenaşén

Erzurum Province
Aşkale Sohane, Şohan, Aşkela, Locus Basara, Şöğayn, Aşhane, Açhane, Ağaçkale, Kale
Çat Ohle, Oyuklu, Çadeli, Çöteli
Erzurum Garin, Karin, Kalikala, Kalikila, Kalıkale, Karnoukalak, Karinites, Erzen ür-Rum, Erzen'ü Rum, Theodosioupolis, Theodosiopolis, Erzerum, Erzrum, Erzrum, Erzırum, Erzirom
Aziziye Ilıca
Ilıca Çermik, Çermük, Çermug, Çermuk, Çermük İl, Çermük İli, Jermouk, Karloi Karnak, Karloi Kamak
Kahramanlar Karaz, Ardzn, Erzen, Karaarz, Arzanibia, Kara Arzn, Kara Arz
Üçköşe Üçkilise, Uçkilise, Ovacık
Palandöken Rizde
Yakutiye
Altınbulak Tifnik, Tivnik, Tvnig, Dvnig
Dadaşköy Kan, Kân
Dumlu Hinis, Aydınlık, Hinok, Hnits, Hins
Hınıs Khnus, Khnous, Hinus, Hısn, Kıns, Huns, Khınus, Xnunis, Xanûs, Khanis, Hinis
Halilçavuş Haçaluys, Xaçaluys
Horasan Pasina Jer, Zanzak, Hursin, Huristan, Pasin-i Süfla, Aşağı Pasin, Aşağı Basen, Xorasan, Khorasan
Akçataş Zanzak, Dzandzag
Gerek Kerak
Güzelyayla Masra
Mağaracık Mahallesi, Teknecik Magsud Çoc, Mokhragyugh, Mohragüğ, Magharajugh, Magaradzhik, Magaradzhuk, Magaradzhug, Mağaracıq
Velibaba Aras, Delilarkent, Delilerkent, Delibab, Delibaba
İspir Speri, Sber, Sper, Siper, Sıper, Saspeir, Hesperit, Espir, Kulka, Kulha, Hyspirátis, Saspeiroi, Saspeiritês
Kırık Grag, Çermeli, Çörmeli
Sırakonak Hodiçor, Hadiçor, Hoduçur, Hodiçur, Hodrçur, Hodorçur, Xodiçur, Xodrçur, Xodorçur, Khodorchur, Khotorjur
Karaçoban Kereçan, Karaçan
Karayazı Bayraktar, Keza, Kardelen
Anıtlı Avbeza
Aydınsu Kaprığ, Kapreh
Göksu Gogsi, Koça
Köprüköy Avnik, Avnig
Narman Namurvan, Namervan, İd, İde, Nerman, Nemiran, Nemirvan, Mamrovani, Mamervan, Mamrevan, Bamervan
Kışlaköy Kışla, Lavsor, Lavtsor
Oltu Oltisi, Voghtik, Olta, Olti, Ohtik, Oltik, Ultik, Tayk, Tao, Tais, Uht’ik, Taik, Oht’ik, Oltis, Oltisni, Okhtis
Alatarla Hovak, Hovag, Xovak
: Kosor, Xosor, Hosor
: Lısbek, Lisbek, Lespek
Olur Olar, Taushe, Panaskert, Tavusker, Tavusger, Olor
: Paniskert, Peneskirt, Penesgird, Panaskerd, Panasgerd, Aşağıpeneskirt
Çataksu Tavusker, Tavuskert, Tavsukert, Tavskert, Tavuskar, Tayots K'ar, Taosk'ari
Pasinler Hasankale, Basean, Basiani, Sokhoista, Sohoista, Hasankala, Basen, Pasin, Parsin, Phasianoi, Paseank, Vağarşavan, Pasini Ulya, Yukarı Pasin, Yukarı Basen
Pazaryolu Norgah, Nörgah, Norgeh, Nor Keğ, Nurgeh, Nor Gyugh
Şenkaya Bardiz, Bardez, Örtülü
Beşpınarlar Vağaver, Vagaver, Vafia
Evbakan Soğmun, Somun, Solumun, Soğomonkale, Soğmunruk, Soğomon Pert
: Bardız, Bardus, Bardéz
Penek Panek, Bana, Ben Hisarı,  Ban, Penak, Penatk, Panak, Banak
: Kamhıs, Kemhıs
Tekman Tatos
Geçitköy Madrak, Geçit
Tortum Tvortum, Tortomi, Tortim, Tortom, Tortoman, Tartum, Turtum, Torcon, Sengistan
Bağbaşı Hah, Hahu, Haho, Hahuli, Khakhuli, Khakhu, Kharkhu, Khakhva
Uzundere Azort, Azhort
Çamlıyamaç Öşkvank, Öşk Vank, Oshki, Oshk Vank, Aşunkavank, Oşvank, Öşki, Oşkvank

Eskişehir Province
Eskişehir Province Sultanönü
Alpu Alpıköy
Beylikova Beylikahır
Çifteler Kabórkeion, Kaborkion, Hısnı’l-Yahûd, Çıfıtlar, Çiftlikât-i Hümayun, Çiftlik-i Hümayun
Eskişehir Dorlion, Dorylaeum, Dorylaion, Dorylaeon, Dorilyon, Dorileon, Dorilaion, Duriliye, Sultanönü, Eskichehir, Darauliya, Adruliya, Drusilya
Odunpazarı
Karacahisar Malachiya, Malachia
Tepebaşı
Çalkara Çal Karye
Şarhöyük Dorlion, Dorilaion, Dorylaeum, Dorylaion, Karaca Hisar
Günyüzü Kozağacı
Beyyayla Sürez, Sıraöz, Siroz, Siroz maa Tefen
Gümüşkonak Yörme, Yürme, Germia, Germa, Myriangeloi
Kayakent: Goeleon, Holanta
Gümüşkonak: Germia, Myriangeloi
Han Hanköy, Hüsrevpaşa, Barçın, Barçınhanı, Han-ı Barçın, Barçin
Yazılıkaya Midas, Midaeíon
İnönü Eserönü, Basilika
Mahmudiye Mahmut San-i Vakfı
Mihalgazi Gümele
Mihalıççık Mihalıçcık, Micalizo, Mihaliccik
Sarıcakaya Burnaklar
Seyitgazi Nacolia, Nacolea, Nakoleia
Doğançayır Arapören, Arabviran
Kırka Kırkağa, Kırk Ağa
Sivrihisar Spaleía, Sibrihisar
Ballıhisar Palia, Palaia Ioustiniopolis, Palea Ioustiniopolis, Pessinoús, Pessinos, Pessinus, Pissinous, Balhisar, Balahisar
Beyyazı Dolaşa, Devletşah
Çaykoz Çaykos
Hamamkarahisar Eudoksiás, Evdoksia, Eudoxias
İstiklalbağı İsrailbağı
Kaymaz Troknáda, Troknades, Regetroknadê, Kaytrus, Yeşilkaymaz, Kaymas
Nasrettinhoca Hortu, Xórtou, Bağbaşı
Zey Zeyköy

Gaziantep Province
Araban Kale, Kele, Raban, Yarımca, Altıntaş, Arat
Gaziantep Antep, Ayıntap, Ayntab, Ayıntab, Ayitap, Ayintap
İslahiye Nikópolis, Niğbolu, Avasim
Karkamış Kargamış, Kargamiş, Karkameşa, Karkemiş, Karxamiş, Karkemish, Carchemish, Karkamiş, Hierápolis, Europus, Europos, Djerabis, Carablus, Cerablus, Cerabis, Gılgamış, Jerabis, Barak, Şeyxavi, Şeyhavi
Nizip Nehrülcevz, Nisibis, Nisibina, Nisib
Belkıs Seleucia, Seleucia on the Euphrates, Seleucia at the Zeugma, Seleucia epi tou Zeugmatos, Seleukeia epi tou Zeugmatos, Zeugma, Selevkaya Euphrates
Kocatepe Tilfar, Tell Fâr
Rumkale Hromkla, Hromkle, Hromgla, Kela Zerin, Qal'ah Rumita, Qal'at al-Rum, Qal'at ar-Rum, Urume, Urima
Nurdağı Kurudere, Gavurdağı
Oğuzeli Büyük Kızılhisar, Kızılhisar, Tilbişar, Tilbaşar
Gündoğan Tilbeşar, Tilbaşar, Tılbaşar, Tilbaşir, Tilbişar, Tilbaraş, Telbaşir, Turbessel
Yavuzeli Cingife

Giresun Province
Giresun Province Vilayeti Çepni
Alucra El Ücra, Elvecre, Mesudiye
Demirözü Eşküne, Eşgüne
Bulancak Terastios, Akköy
Çamoluk Mindaval, Mindeval, Teştik, Taşdig
Çanakçı Kuzca
Dereli Dölçukuru
Yavuzkemal Kırık, Nahiye'i Kırık
Doğankent Harşıt, Harşit, Harşut, Xarşid, Xarşut, Aşağı Kürtün, Kürtün-i Zir, Kürtün-ü Zir, Manastırbükü, Manastır Bükü
Espiye Andoz, Andos, Esbüyeli, İsbiye, Zefre, Zephyrion, Zephyrium
Eynesil Ayvasil, Ágios Basílios
Giresun Kerasounta, Kerasountas, Kérasounde, Kerassunde, Kerasous, Kerasus, Kerasuni, Kerasunt, Kerasunta, K'erosili, Kirésson, Kiresun, Cerasus, Farnakya, Farnakia, Pharnacia, Parnakia, Pharnace, Hirades, Choerades, Giresin
Görele Koralla, Kordyle, Philokaleia
Kuşçulu Kuşçu Ali
Güce Küçe, Alahanas
Keşap Kassiópe, Kassiopi, Iossopi, İossopi
Piraziz Piridede, Abdal, Abdalırum, Abdal İskele Pazarı, Bendehor, Mendehorya
Şebinkarahisar Şapkarahisar, Şarkikarahisar, Şarkî Karahisar, Karahisar-ı Şarkî, Şabin-Garahisar, Chebin Karahissar, Karahisar, Garasari, Şarkî Kara Hisar, Shabin-Karahisar, Şapin-Garahisar, Kolonya, Kolonia, Koloneia, Colonia, Köğonya, Koğoniya, Koğonya, K'oğonya, Köğoniya, Mavrokastron, Maurókastron, Nikopoli, Nikopolis
Asarcık Licese
Güneygören İsola, Esola
Sarıyer Hahavla
Tamzara Tenzere, Tamsara
Tirebolu Tiriboli, Tiribolu, Tripolis, Tripoli, Ischopolis, Direboli, Ayana, Agiá Anna
Karademir İregür, Argyra, Argyria
Örenkaya Bedrama, Bedrum, Kale-i Bedrema, Petroma
Yağlıdere Camiyanı, Palaki

Gümüşhane Province
Gümüşhane Province Canıca, Canca, Tzanika, Chaldia, Khaldia, Kaldia, Haldiya
Gümüşhane Argyropolis, Kaldia, Chaldia, Argüropolis, Gumuch Hane, Argyroupoli, Argyroupolis, Vertsxlis Tsixe, Kokissós
Dumanlı Santa
Kale Kovans, Konas, Koğanıs, Köğanız, Koğants
Olucak İmera
Tekke Selseki
Yağlıdere Kromni, Kromne, Korom, Krom, Kurum, Gorom
Yağmurdere Keşişköy, Keşişköyü, Keşköy
Yeniyol Meyhazer, Meyhazar
Yitirmez Leri, Lerion, Getirmez, Yetirmez
Kelkit Gayl Get
Gümüşgöze Alansa, Alangasa
Sadak Satal, Satala
Ünlüpınar Pekün
Yeniyol Pöske, Pösge, Posge, Bükse
Kürtün Kürtün-i Bala, Uluköy
Sapmaz Gelivera, Gelivar, Gelevera, Özlüce, Gelevar, Gelava, Gelenvar
Şiran Karaca, Cheriana, Cherianas, Cheroiana, Heriana, Şiryan
Evren Söfker, Sefker
Torul Ardasa, Ardasas, Ardassa, Droúla
Alınyayla Macara
Altınpınar Zermut
Arılı Balaya
Arpalı Görükse
Atalar Tsimera
Aydınlar Muzena, Moúzaina, Mouzena, Pas
Bahçelik Colaşana, Çolaşana
Budak Şive
Buüyükçit Çite, Çitikebir
Cebeli Baladan, Balant
Dağdibi Fidikâr
Demirkapı Manastır
Gülaçar Nivene
Gümüştuğ Avliyana
Günay Daisa, Dayısa, Dayisa, Güney
Güvemli Haviyana, Havyana
Güzeloluk Beşkilise
Harmancık Demirci Suyu
Işık Bayana
İnkılap Musalla
Kirazlık Goriyana, Koryana
Kocadal Genek
Kopuz Kollu
Köstere Köstire, Köstüre
Küçükçit Çitisagir
Soğuksu İdliye
Tokçam Fırfıra, Fırfara, Firfara, Firfira
Uğurtaşı İstavri
Yalınkavak Solokhaina, Sorogaina, Soruyana, Soryana, Soroyna, Saruyanı, Saruyatu, Sorina
Yeşilköy Langas
Yıldız Adisa, Adise
Yurtköy Zaga
Yücebelen Silve
Zigana Ziğana, Zığana

Hakkari Province
Çukurca Çele, Çel, Çal
Çığlı Aşuta, Aşitha, Tiyari
Derecik Rubaruk, Rubarok, Gerdi, Kürdi
Hakkâri Çölemerik, Colemerg, Akkārē, Julamerk, Yolemrek, Çolamerg, Djulamerik, Gulamark, Culamerg, İlmar
Çanaklı Paz, Baz, Kehê
Konak Koçhanis, Kocanis, Kodşanis, Koçanis, Kodşanıs, Kudşanis, Qudşanis, Qudshanes, Qodchanis, Kotchanes, Qochanis
Şemdinli Shemsdin, Şemzinan, Shamizdin, Jilu, Cilo, Şamizdin, Şemzîna, Şemdîna, Şemdinan, Gür-i Şemdinan, Navşar
Aktütün Bezele, Bezeli
Bağlar Nehri, Neri, Nairi
Güzelkonak Haruna, Harunan, Harun
Meşelik Herikli, Herki, Hereki
Sarıca Zerik, Zeriki, Zıriki, Zerikı
Yüksekova Gever, Gawar, Gaur, Gwer, Gabr, Gawr, Gevar, Dize
Dağlıca Oremar, Oramar, Uramar
Esendere Bajirge, Bajirgan, Bajirge Mezin
Yeşiltaş İştazin, Iştazn, Jilu

Hatay Province
Hatay Province Hatteia
Altınözü Kuseyr, Al-Qusayr, El-Qusayr
Antakya Antioch ad Orontes, Antioch, Ἀντιόχεια ἡ ἐπὶ Ὀρόντου, Antiókheia hē epì Oróntou, Syrian Antioch
Antakya Antiochia, Antioch, Antiyokya, Antiócheia, Antioch on the Orontes, Syrian Antioch, Antiocheia epi Daphne, Antiocheia he epi Orontou, Antiocheia he Megale, Antiochia ad Orontem, Antiokia, Antiyokhya, Antiok, Antakiya
Kurtuluş Street, Antakya Herod Caddesi
Serinyol Bedirge, Bedirgiyye, El-Batriqeyn, El-Batrikeyn, El-Batraken, Bedrigiyye, Batrikeyn, Patrikeyn, Batırga
Defne Dàphne
Harbiye Defne, Dàphne, Dafne, Dafni, Harbiyat, Daphne Syrias, Beytülma
Arsuz Uluçınar, Rhosus, Rhosos, Rhossus, Rhossos, Rhoso, Hrosos, Rhosopolis, Rhopolis, Port Panel, Kabev, Kabevli, Arsous, Ar-Ruşuş
Belen Beylan, Aynül Tel, Aynültel, Maziku Bagras, Bab-ı İskenderun, Bâbu'l-İskenderûn
Ötençay Bakras, Bagras, Bakraz, Baghras, Bağras, Págrai, Pagrae, Pagrás, Gaston, Gastun, Guascon, Gastim
Dörtyol Çork Marzban, Çork Marzman, Çokmerzimen
Altınçağ İcadiye
Karakese Karakise, Karakilise
Konaklı Rabat
Özerli Uzeyr, Üzerli, Ulu Türkmen
Yeşilköy Kinet Höyük, İssos, Issos, Issus, Ἱσσός
Erzin Yeşilkent
İskenderun Myriandrus, Alexandretta, Scanderoon, Alexandria, Aleksandria, al Iskandarun, El-iskenderûn, Alexandreia Minor, Aleksandra, Aleksandreíon
Kırıkhan
Alaybeyli Bayezid Bostanı, Eba Yezid el-Bestami, Amik Pazarı, Darbısak
Ceylanlı Telbizek, Darbısak, Derbisek, Darb el-Sakk, Darbı Sak, Trapessac
Kumlu Killik
Payas Ayas, Yakacık, Paias, Bayas, Bayyas, Baiai, Baiás, Παίας
Reyhanlı İrtah, Artah, Artax, Değirmenkaşı, Reyhaniye, Ar-Rayhaniyah, Alallah
Samandağ Süveyde, Süveydiye, Suveydiye el Mina, Yukarı Alevışık, Levşiye, Svedia, Suedia, Seman Dağ, Cebel Seman, Cebel-i Seman, St Symeon, Seleucia Pieria, Seleucia by the Sea, Σελεύκεια ἐν Πιερίᾳ
Vakıflı Vak'if, Hıdırbey Vakfı
Yayladağı Cebel-i Akra, Ordu, Beysun Muradiye

Iğdır Province
Iğdır Province Sürmeli
Aralık Başan, Aralıq, Aralikh, Paşkuh, Başko
Yenidoğan Akori, Ahuri, Ahora, Akhuri, Arguri, Ağori, Ağrı, Akra, Akre, Axura, Ağor'i, Agor'i, Maksizillo
Iğdır Igdir, İdir, Tsolakert, Reşkelas, İğdır, İydir
Suveren Ergof, Horgof, Horkof, Orgof
Karakoyunlu Tsolagerd
Taşburun Teşberun, Kâfirköy, İslamköy
Tuzluca Kulp, Koghb, Qulp, Duzluca, Elidizk
Sürmeli Sürmeli, Surmalı, Surmali, Surmalu, Surmari, Surb Mari

Isparta Province
Isparta Province Hamit, Hamit Eli, Hamit İli
Aksu Anamas, Yenice
Akçaşar Tymbriada, Timbriada, Timbiriada, Tymbrias, Timbrias, Τυμβριάς, Τιμβρίας, Τιμβρίαδα, Τυμβρίαδα
Atabey Agrai, Agron, Agros, Ağros, Agrás
Bayat Selef, Seleukeia hê Sidêra, Seleucia Ferrea, Seleucia Sidera, Σελεύκεια η Σιδηρᾶ, Seleuceia, Seleukeia, Claudioseleucia, Klaudioseleukeia
Harmanören Göndürle, Göndüler
İslamköy Doiantos, Hıristiyanköy, Gavurköy
Eğirdir Krozos, Prostanna, Prostaina, Akroterion, Akrotiri, Akroteri, Akridur, Cennetabad, Egridur, Eğridir
Barla Parlais, Parlaos, Kocapınar
Gelendost Gelandos, Gelendos, Kelainai, Kalandai, Kelainitai
Gönen Gönan, Konánes, Konána, Comana, Conana, Conan, Iustinianoupolis
Gümüşgün Baladız, Baradıs, Aporidos, Aporidós Kômê
Keçiborlu Kiçiborlu, Kiçi Borğlu, Eudoxipolis
Isparta İs-Barid, Sparta, Sparti, Baris, Sparti Pisidias, Sbarita, Sabarta, Hamidabad
Senirkent Plinistra, Tymandos
Sütçüler Pitaşşa, Bavullu, Cebel, Bavlu, Bavli, Pavli
Ayvalıpınar Karabavlu, Karabavli, Karabavullu, Bavlu, Bavlı, Pavli, Ayvalı, Pavloú, Παύλου, Adada, Άδαδα, Όδαδα
Sağrak Άδαδα, Όδαδα, Adada
Şarkikaraağaç Karaağaç, Karaaç, Garaaç, Neapolis
Uluborlu Apollonia, Zosopolis, Sozopolis, Borğlu, Borgulu, Mordiaum
Yalvaç Antiokhia, Antiochetta, Antiocheia Minor, Antakya el-Muhterika, Antioch of Pisidia, Antioch in Pisidia, Antiochia in Pisidia, Antiocheia in Psidia, Antiocheia tis Pisidias, Antiochia Caesareia, Antiochia Colonia Caesarea, Antiochia in Phrygia, Pisidian Antioch, Psidia Antioch, Pisidia Antiochia, Pisidia Antiokheia, Pisidia Antiokhia'sı, Yalabaç, Yalavaç
Yenişarbademli Gorgorum, Bademli, Şarköy, Yenişar

İstanbul Province
Istanbul Konstantinoúpolis, Konstantinopolis, Konstantiniyye, Kostantiniye, Estambul, Byzantium, Byzántion, Constantinople, Konstantinoúpoli, Constantinopolis, Lygos, Nova Roma, Nea Rome, New Rome, Alma Roma, Byzantine Rome, Byzantias Rome, Eastern Rome, Roma Constantinopolitana, Augusta Antonina, Basileuousa, Megalopolis, Polis, Miklagarðr, Miklagard, Miklagarth, Rumiyyat al-Kubra, Takht-e Rum, Tsargrad, Carigrad, Czargrad, Tzargrad, Carihrad, Vasilis Polis, Vasileos Polis
European Side Rumeli Yakası, Avrupa Yakası
Arnavutköy Arnaout Kevi, Αρναούτκιοϊ
Hadımköy Hademkeui
Bağcılar Çıfıtburgaz, Yeşilbağ
Güneşli Papazçiftliği
Kirazlı Aypa, Ayapa, Ayaparazlı
Mahmutbey Kalafaki, Kalfa Köy, Kalfaköy, Kalfa
Bahçelievler Hepdemon
Kocasinan Nifos, Nifols, Νύφες
Şirinevler Androniko, Androniko Bağı, Androniko Bahçesi
Yenibosna Saraybosna
Bakırköy Makriköy, Makri Köy, Makro Hori
Ataköy Baruthane
Yeşilköy Ayastefanos, San Stefanos, Hagios Stefanos, San Stefano
Başakşehir Azatlı, Azatlık, Resneli Çiftliği
Güvercintepe Bayramtepe
Kayabaşı Ayayorgi, Άγιος Γεώργιος
Bayrampaşa Sağmalcılar
Beylikdüzü Garden, Kavaklı
Gürpınar Anarşa, Anarşe, Ano Arsou, Aresou, Aretsou, Areto, Arsou, Anarsa, Anarkha
Kavaklı Garden, Gardan, Garda, Gardas
Beyoğlu Pera
Taksim Aya Triada
Esenler Litros
Atışalanı Avas, Avaz
Esenyurt Eşkinoz, Ksenos, İkşinos
Eyüp Eyüpsultan, Kosmidion, ta Paoulines, Κοσμίδιον, τα Παυλίνης
Fatih
Sultanahmet Hipodrom
Gaziosmanpaşa Taşlıtarla
Yıldıztabya Dörtyol, Karlıtepe
Güngören Vidos, Vidoz
Kâğıthane Sadabad, Glykà Nerà, Γλυκά Νερά
Sarıyer Simas, Sarıyar, Saruyar
Garipçe Xárybdes
Rumelifeneri Phanarion, Phanarakion, Φανάριον, Φαναράκιον
Şişli
Feriköy Aya Dimitri
Gülbahar Gülbağ
Kurtuluş Tatavla, Ταταύλα
Zeytinburnu Strongylon, Kyklobion, Elaion Akra, Στρογγυλόν, Κυκλόβιον
Balıklı Balukli, Pege, Μπαλουκλί, Πηγή
Anatolian Side Anadolu Yakası, Asya Yakası
Beykoz Beicos, Beikos, Amikos, Amnicus, Αμικός, Αμνικός
Anadoluhisarı Güzelcehisar, Güzelce Hisar
Anadolukavağı Hieron, Hieron Stoma, Ιέρων
Çubuklu Katangion
Kanlıca Kağnılıca
Örnekköy Tepetarla
Riva Çayağzı, İrva
Kadıköy Kalkedon, Khalkedon, Halkedeon, Chalcedon, Chalkedon, Karkhedon
Maltepe Bryas, Vryas
Altıntepe Yenikarye, Yenikariye
Tuzla Akritas, Niğde, Yiğitli
Ümraniye Yalnız Selvi, Balghurla
Üsküdar Chrysopolis, Hrisopolis, Scutari, Skutari, Khrysopolis, Khrisopolis, Krizopolis, Krisopolis, Scutarii, Scutàrion, Skutarium, Skutarion, Skoutarion
Out of Metropolitan Area (Thracian Side)
Büyükçekmece Athyra, Athyras, Atira, Mega Zeugma
Ahmediye Papazburgaz, Papaz Bergos, Fanasakris
Celaliye Çetros, Şatıroz, Sahteros, Şahteros, Ksasteros, Heksásteros, Heksastros, Heksastérion, Heksásteron, Eksastero, Eksastro, Exastero, Exastro, Ksastro, Ksastero, Xastro, Sastro
Güzelce Dimokraneia, Çöplüce, Dimokrateia, Damokráneia, Panagía
Kamiloba Yaloz, Yalos, Yialós, Eyali, Agios Paulos, Aigialoi, Aigialous, Gialous
Kumburgaz Oikonomeio, Ikonomio, Oikonomeíon, Oikonomeíou Pyrgos, Konomio, Konomiou, Konom Burgaz, Konum Burgaz, Konumburgas, Kunum Burgaz, Pirgasi
Mimarsinan Kallikrateia Anatolikis Thrakis, Kallikrateia, Kalikratiya, Kalikratya
Sinanoba Damokráneia, Çöplüce, Çaplacıköy
Türkoba Arnavutköy
Ulus Playa, Plagia, Playiá
Çatalca Ergiske, Ergiscus, Metrae, Metre, Metrai, Metris, Metraj, Matrai, Metron, Hanice, Haniçe, Çetince
Binkılıç Istranca, Strantza, Strangia, Strantza
Ovayenice Nihor, Nihori
Yalıköy Podima, Podena, Πόδηµα, Πόδενα
Silivri Selymbria, Selybria, Silivria
Fener Fenerköy, Fanari, Phanari, Phanárion
Gümüşyaka Eski Ereğli, Herakliapolis, Heraklia, Eraklia, Ereğli, Silibreç, Daonium
Kurfallı Kainophroúrion, Cenophrurium, Coenophrurium, Kenophlorion, Caenophrurium, Koúrphaloi
Ortaköy Delliones, Sürgünköy
Selimpaşa Epibates, Epivates, Epibatos, Epivates Thrakis, Epivati, Epibatai, Plivates, Pivato, Bogados, Bigados, Bivados, Biğados, Daoneion
Out of Metropolitan Area (Bithynian Side)
Şile Xêlê, Chili, Chele, Kilia, Psilis
Ağva Acqua, Akova, Yeşilçay
Kurfallı Kainophroúrion
Sahilköy Domalı
Yeniköy Ano/Kato Neohorion

İzmir Province
İzmir Zmurna, Zmirni, Esmirna, Smyrna, Ismir, Myrrha
Balçova Balçık Havi, Balçıkhavli
İnciraltı Nea Kastro
Bayraklı Palaia Smyrna, Palea Smyrna, Paleo Smyrna
Tepekule Hacı Mutço
Turan Agia Triada, Teganion
Bornova Akropedon, Pirino Barys, Birunabad, Bournabad, Bournabat, Bournobas, Bournovas, Prinobaris, Prinovaris, Bournova, Burunova, Burunabat, Bornava, Burnava
Altındağ Kokluca, Koğulça, Koğuluça, Kokuluçay
Buca Boutzas, Kohi, Gonia, Bugia, Vuza, Uza, Vuzas
Şirinyer Paradiso, Kızılçullu
Çiğli Silleon
Gaziemir Imerion, Sevdiköy, Seydiköy 
Karabağlar
Üçkuyular Uyracti 
Karşıyaka Kordelya, Kordelyo, Kordelio, Peraia, Κορδελιό, Περαία
Bostanlı Papazköy, Papazkale, Papaz İskelesi, Papaz, Papa Skala
Şemikler Tomaza
Yamanlar Amanara, Sipylus, Sipvlos, Genikon, Jenikou
Konak
Alsancak Punta
Basmane Agias Vuklas 
Göztepe Enopi
Susuzdede Ayos Agopi
Güzelyalı Mirakti 
Hatay Mısırlı
Hilal Stavros, Istravoz, İstavroz
Kahramanlar Mortakya, Murtakiye, Mourtakía
Kadifekale Pagos
Umurbey Darağaç, Darağacı, Cerenage, Takoz Deliği, Şehitler
Narlıdere Ayasefüd, Ayasefid, Akhilleion
Alaçatı Agrilya
Aliağa Mirina, Myrina
Nemrutkale Nemrut Kalesi, Aigai, Aegae, Aigaiai
Nemrutlimanı Kime, Kyme, Cyme, Cymi, Phrikonis, Nemrutkale, Nemrut Kalesi
Yenişakran Girneyon, Gryneion
Bayındır Caystrus, Vaindirion
Zeytinova Falka, Falaka, Zeytinbağı
Bergama Pergamon, Pergam, Pergamos, Pergamum
Aşağıbey Perperina, Perperene, Περπερηνή, Perperini, Perperena, Περπερήνα, Perperina, Parparum, Parparon, Παρπάρων, Perine, Perpere, Permere, Theodosiópolis, Theodosioupolis, Θεοδοσιούπολις
İsmailli Yuntdağı, Yuntdağ
Kadıköy Gavurköy
Ovacık Kolarga, Kalerga
Sindel Sindala
Yukaribey Trarion, Trarium, Τράριον
Zeytindağ Kilisa, Elaya, Elaea, Kazıkbağlar, Kazıkbağları, Cidaenis, Kidaenis, Kilisköy, Kiliseköy, Reşadiye
Beydağ Palaiapolis, Palaiópolis, Balyanbolu, Balyambolu, Beyköy, Karye-i Beğ
Erikli Tasavra, Tasahorya
Yeniyurt Cibre 
Çeşme Cyssus, Cyssys, Krini, Cysus, Kisus, Kal'a-i Hoşabad
Ildır Eritre, Ildırı, Aldırı, Erythrae, Litri, Ritra, Erythrai, Erythra, Erythrae, Erythres, Erythraia
Dikili Atarna, Dikmelik, Dük İli, Aterneus
Bademli Ankanos, Ancanos, Anxíalos, Angelos, Άγγελος
Çandarlı Pitani, Pitane, Pitanes, Pytani
Kabakum Hondrammos, Chondrammos, Chondrammo, Χόνδραμμος, Καμπακούμ
Foça Phokaia, Fokaia, Phocaea, Pa-uwa-ke, Palea Phocaea, Eski Foça, Kara Foça, Foça-i Atik, Karaca Foça, Παλαιά Φωκαία
Yenifoça Néa Phokaia, Nea Focea, Yenice, Kyllene, Ascanius Portus, Foglia Nuova, Foça-i Cedid
Güzelbahçe Kilizman, Kilizmanya, Cilizman, Kızılbahçe
Karaburun Mimas, Stelar,  Stylarius, Caleberno, Calaberno, Ahırlı, Karaburna
Karareisçiftliği Meli
Mordoğan Emir Doğan, İmirtogan, İmir Togan, Mardawana, Mürduğan, Μολτοβάν 
Kemalpaşa Nif, Nimfeon, Nymphaion, Nympheon
Kınık Gambreion
Kiraz Kleos, Kilos, Koloe, Koloi, Keles, Keleş
Menderes Cumaovası, Cumaabad
Ahbetbeyli Notium, Notion, Nation, Hristiyanköy, Gavurköy, Ahmedbeyli
Ahmetbeyli, Ales Valley Klaros, Claros, Clarus
Çamönü Traşça, Tıraça, Tıraca, Trança, Tiraça, Terasia
Çakaltepe Mesavli, Mesaulê
Çatalca Sandı
Çileme Çineme
Değirmendere Kolofon, Kolophon, Colophon
Gümüldür Gümüşsu, Kimitouria, Megali Kimitúria
Oğlananası Oğlanas
Özdere Kesre, Kesri, Kástri, Dios Hieron
Tekeli Beleriç
Menemen Yazhisar, Maenomenus, Mainomenos, Menemenos, Menemenus, Mainoménou Kámpos, Tarxaniyat, Tarxaniotes, Menemenye, Menemeni, Melemen, Melemenye, Temnus
Buruncuk Büyükburuncuk, Larisa, Laqrisa, Lárissa, Larisa Phrikonis
Ödemiş Ötemiş, Odemisio, Eudaimos, Adamis, Οδεμήσιο
Bademli Bademiye, Potamiá, Bükürgüme
Bayırlı Burgaz, Pyrgós
Birgi Pyrgion, Pyrgí, Dios Hieron, Dioshieron, Christoupolis, Πυργίον, Διός Ἱερόν, Χριστούπολις
Bozdağ Tmolos, Mesotmolos, Τμῶλος
Çamyayla Lübbey, Lubbey, Lutbey
Elmabağ Elmabağı, Tekke, Tekke Samut, Şeyh Samud
Gölcük Torrhebia, Subatan Yaylası, Gölcik
Günlüce Dabbey, Dadbey, Datbey, Tapai, Tapay, Dabay, Dağdibi, Hypaepa, Hypaipa, Hipæpa, Aipos,  Ὕπαιπα
Hamam Mendegüme
Horzum Mendegüme, Harezm, Harzem
Işık Mamuriye
İlkkurşun Hacıilyas, Burhaniye
Kaymakçı Kaymaklı
Konaklı Adagüme, Adıgüme, Ariokômê
Ortaköy Medeksis
Ovakent Digda, Adagide, Adıgider
Şirinköy Keçililer
Türkönü Ayasurat, Ayasurt, Agios Eustratios, Neikaia
Üçkonak Samut Baba
Yılanlı Yılanyayla
Yolüstü Bazdegümi, Bezdegüme, Bezdemiye
Seferihisar Sivrihisar, Sifrihisar, Tsaferinos, Tsaferin, Tsafernhisar
Doğanbey İpsili, İpsili Hisar, Psilós, Psilí, Myonnesos
Sığacık Sigalê, Sigali, Siagi, Teo, Teos
Tepecik Hereketepeciği
Ürkmez Lebedos, Lebedus, Ortemes, Artemizi, Ορτεμές, Αρτεμίζι
Cıfıtkalesi Islet, Myonessus
Selçuk Ayasuluk, Ayasuluğ, Ayasluğ, Ayasoluk, Agia Soulouk, Agiasolouk, Ágios Theológos, Ayios Theologos
Efes Efesos, Ephesos, Ephesus, Apasa, Abasa
Gökçealan Burgaz, Bergos, Yeni Bergos, Pýrgos
Şirince Çirkince, Kirkince, Kırkınca, Kirkice, Kenxrios, Kenkhrios, Solmissós
Tire Thira, Theira, Theira Mikras Asias, Tyrrha, Tarrha, Tirha, Teira, Tyrha
Torbalı Metrópoli, Metropolis, Puranda, Triyanna, Tripolis
Cumhuriyet Yazıbaşı, Fortuna, Xortena, Xortuna
Urla Vourlá, Klazomenai, Clazomenae, Vryula, Klazümen, Urlı
Balıklıova Polikhne, Polikne, Polichna, Balıklı
Uzunada Köstence, Kösten, Drymoussa, Makronisi, Englezonisi, İngiliz, Büyük Urla
Barbaros Turgut, Aya Pantelimon, Agios Panteleimonas, Άγιος Παντελεήμονας, Αγιος Παντελεήμων
Çiftlik Aya Paraskevi, Αγία Παρασκευή, Αγίας Παρασκευής, Τσιφλίκι
Toloz Tholos, Kayabaşı, Aya Nikola, Θόλος, Αϊ-Νικόλας, Αγιος Νικόλαος

Kahramanmaraş Province
Kahramanmaraş Province Zülkadriye, Dulkadir
Afşin Yarpuz, Arabissus, Arabissos, Arebsus, Avşin, el-Efsus, Efsus, Efsun, Afşın, Afşun, Afsun, Ephesós
 Tanir: Tanadaris
Andırın Enderun, Andron, And Veren, Andrion, Adrassós, Andrassós
Çağlayancerit Cirid, Çağlayan Ceridi
Düzbağ Helete
Ekinözü Cela, Celaki, Celiki, Celegi, Asandere, Ahsendere
Altınyaprak Nergele, Nergile, Narkele 
Elbistan Albistan, Ablastayn, Ablasta, Plasta, Ablastan, Ablistan, Ablestin, Ablustan, Ablasteyn, Ablasthene, Ablüsteyn, Ablustayn, Ablistin, Albustan, Albıstan, Elbostan, Olbistan
Göksun Kykysòs, Coxon, Cucusus, Goskin, Kokusus, Cocussus, Kokson, Koksen, Köksün, Göksün, Koukousós, Koukouson
 Keklikoluk: Sirikis, Siricis
Kahramanmaraş Maraş, Marasin, Marási, Marqasi, Dulkadir, Zülkadiriye, Zülkadriye, Germanikópolis, Germanikeia, Germanicia, Marasaion, Marach
Dulkadiroğlu İmamaşirfiroş
Onikişubat
Süleymanlı Zeytun, Zeitun, Zeyt’un, Zeytunfimis, Zeytünfimis, Zeytin
Pazarcık Bağdin Sağir
Keleş Kelleş
Türkoğlu Eloğlu, İloğlu, Tecirli, Tecerlü, Tecirlü, Kirdohli, Kürdoğlu, Kurdohli

Karabük Province
Karabük Haluna
Eflani Philomenion, Phylomenes
Eskipazar Hadrianopolis, Viranşehir, Hadrianopolis in Paphlagonia, Adrianoupolis en Paflagonia, Hadrianapolis, Andrinoupolis, Gefyra, Mecidiye
Karabük Öğlebeli
Ovacık Ulak, Şehbettün, Şehabettin, Şehübiddin
Safranbolu Zalifre, Dadibra, Dadybra, Flaviopolis, Theodoroupolis, Theodoroupoli, Theodoropolis, Sadrabolu, Hadrianopolis, Germia, Taraklıborlu, Taraklı Borglu, Borglu, Borlu, Borli, Saframpolis, Saframpoli, Zağfiranpolis, Zağferanbolu, Zağfiran Benderli, Zağfiran Borlu, Zağfiran Bolu, Zafranbolu
Yenice Çeltik

Karaman Province
Ayrancı Osmaniye
Ambar Sidamara, Sidamariai Ambararası
Üçharman Divle, Devle, Değle, Zivle
Başyayla
Bozyaka Gerde, Kerde
Kirazlıyayla Laúzada, Laúzados, Lavzad, Lafsa
Üzümlü Davdas
Ermenek Germanicopolis, Germenikopolis, Germanapolis, Germanig, Clibanus, Germanicus, Ermenak, İrmenek
Ardıçkaya Nadire, Nadra
Balkusan Balgusan, Balkasun, Bağbelen
Elmayurdu İznebol, Zenopolis, Zenonópolis
Çatalbadem İrnebol, Yukarı İrnebol, Irenopolis, Eirinoupolis, Eirenepolis, Eirenópolis
Gökçekent Akmanastır
Güneyyurt Gargara, Gargar, Karkara
İkizçınar İrnebol, Aşağı İrnebol, Irenopolis, Eirinoupolis, Eirenepolis, Eirenópolis
Katranlı Dindebol, Domitiopolis
Yukarı Çağlar İzvid-i Ulvi, Yukarı İzvit, İzvit, Yukarıçağlar, Bide, Sbide
Karaman Larende, Landra, Laranda
Akçaalan Filadelfiya, Philadelphía
Üçkuyu: Barata, Baratha, Boratinon Mons
Akçaşehir Adışar, Akçaşar
Çakırbağ Dilbeyan, Delbiyan, Derbeyn, Derbe, Dervi, Δέρβη, Derveia, Δέρβεια
Çiğdemli Davgandos
Dereköy Fisandın, Fisandon, Dere
Ekinözü Aşıran, Aşran, Derbe, Kerti Höyük, Claudioderbe
Erenkavak Anamas
Güneyyurt Gargara, Gargar
Kazancı Aybaham, Aybaxam, Agios Paxomios, Agios Pachomios, Agios Pakhomios
Kisecik Kilisecik
Paşabağı Gövestir
Sudurağı Sıdır Ova, Sıdırova, Sadr-ı Ova, Sıdırva
Taşkale Kızıllar
Yeşildere İbrala
Yollarbaşı İlisira, İlisıra, İlistra
Kazımkarabekir Gaferiyat, Kâfiriyat, Gafferiyat

Kars Province
Akyaka Şuregel, Şöregel, Şuragel, Şirakel, Şureğul, Şirak İli, Kızılçakçak, Kızılçak, Mihaylovka, Kızılçaççak, Şuregil, Şurekul
Çetindurak Şiragavan, Şirakavan, Başşüregel
Demirkent Yukarı Ergine, Yukarı Arkina, Yukarı Argino, Başşuragel
Kalkankale Tiknis
Kayaköprü İslam Ergine
Arpaçay Zarşat, Zaruşat, Zarişad, Zaruşad, Zaroşad, Zaroşat, Grenaderskoye, Grenaderskoe, Grenada, Tzinubani, Zarşed, Sula Zarishtiani, Zarishat
Akçalar Xoroşoye, Keçebörg
Değirmenköprü Cedere, Cedre, Çadari
Doğruyol Cala, Çala, Çalışköy, Duruyol
Kuyucuk Petropavlovka
Mescitli Novo Troitskoe, Troitskoye, Dukhobor
Meydancık Novo Petrovka
Tomarlı Vanaza, Veneze, Vanagan
Yalınçayır Olşanka, Ol'shanka, Zohrab, Zohrap
Kağızman Kagızvan, Kaghzovan, Kaghyizman, Kaghzvan, Gağzıvan, Gağezvan, Ağzevani, Kaghisman, Karsovan
Tunçkaya Keçivan, Geçivan, Geçvan, Keçravan, Keçror, Keçran, Kechran, Geçivan-ı Dudman
Kars Karsak, Ghars, Kariskalaki, Karsi, Keris, Karuts' Berd, Karuts' K'aghak, Amrots'n Karuts, Amurn Karuts
Akbaba Ardos, Ardost
Alçılı Berdik
Anı Khnamk, Ánion, Abnicum, Anisi, Ani, Ocaklı
Boğazköy Prokhladnoye, Melik Köy, Prohladnoe
Boğatepe Büyük Zavod, Büyük Zavut, Pazarcık
Çakmak Blagodarnoye
Çamurlu Chamerluh
Dikme Novo Mihaylovka, Novo Mikhailovka
Esenkent Şöreyel Gala, Cala, Şüregel Cala'sı
Gelirli Kaniköy, Kanlıköy, Ganiköy, Agnaşen
Karaçoban Aravartan, Haram Vartan
Kümbetli Vladikars, Viladikars, Lazikars, Ladıkars, Ladikers
Ölçülü Vezin, Vaze, Vjan, Vizinkov
Yolaçan Aleksandrovka, Komatsor, Komasor
Sarıkamış Kamuşan, Egegnik, Yeghegnik
Çamyazı Yukarımicingirt
İnkaya Micingert, Micingirt, Mjingerd, Mijingerd, Mujtekerd, Mıjınkert, Lejengerd, Mecingerd, Mecingert, Mecingird, Micingerd Süfla, Aşağımicingirt
Soğanlı Salanlug, That, Tahtdüzü
Süngütaşı Zivin
Selim Novo Selim
Gürbüzler Verişan
Koyunyurdu Berne, Perna
Susuz Cılavuz, Cilavuz, Cilaviz, Gelavej, Clavuz, Novo Dubovka
Aynalı Inaluh
Çamçavuş Vorontsovka
Gölbaşı Geolbashy
İncesu Malaya Vorontsovka, Malaia Vorontsovka
Karapınar Karapoongar
Kayadibi Kızılçakçak, Garmirçağatzak
Ortalar Ortakilise, Ortakilesa
Porsuklu Pokrovka
Taşlıca Karakale, Karakala
Yolboyu Zaim, Romanovo, Romanovka, Asıl Zaim, Uzunzayım, Uzun Zaim, Küçük Zaim, Harmanlı

Kastamonu Province
Kastamonu Province İsfendiyar, Paflagonya, Paflogonya
Abana Aiginetes, Abanou Teichos, Abanou Teikhes, Abonteichos, Aboni Teichos, Aboni Tichos, Abonutechos, Abonitichos, Abonitychos, Abonoteichos, Abonu Teichus, Abonuteichus, Avonotichos, Aponi Tichos, Apana
Ağlı Ağlı
Araç Araç
Azdavay Çarşamba
Bozkurt Pazaryeri, Hamidiye
Alantepe Gölmend, Gölment
Bayramgazi Monna
Beldeğirmen Niğerze, Niyerze
Çiçekyayla Şeyhşaban, Şeyhçoban
Görentaş Gerdiç
Güngören Zalema
Günvakti Guvatta
Isırganlık Süpdüge, Surp Digin, Sürdükme
İlişi Yakaören
İnceyazı Yunarı
Kocaçam Izırma, Zırma
Koşmapınar Oday, Utay
Kutluca Aya, Ayia
Sarıçiçek Sinciros, Sincaros
Şen Narba
Tezcan Tezce
Yaşarlı İzmana, Izmala
Yaylatepe Arza
Yeni Mimir
Yılmaz Kilmes
Yüksek Heniye, Heni, Yukarı Heni
Cide Karaağaç
Aydos Aigialos, Aigalos
Gideros Kytoros, Cytorus, Cytorum, Kytoron, Kitoros, Kidros
İlyasbey Fakaz, Fakoz, Fağraz
Çatalzeytin Çatalzeytin
Kavakören Mamlay, Zakro, Akçay
Daday Daday
Devrekani Devlethanı
Doğanyurt Hoşalay, Meset, Kallistrateia
Hanönü Gökçeağaç
İhsangazi İhsangazi
İnebolu İonopolis, Ionopolis, İonopoli, İnepolis, Inepolis, Inepoli, İnepoli, Yiğit İnebolu, Yiğitinebolu
Gemiciler Evrenye
Gökbel Çerçille
Kastamonu Kastamoni, Kastra Komnen, Kastamon, Kastamuni, Kastra Komninon
Kasaba Kasabaköy, Gaşgaba
Küre Küre-i Nuhas
Pınarbaşı Çamkışla, Erkemle, Tekkeşin
Seydiler Seydiler
Şenpazar Şehribani, Şarabana, Şarabani, Şarbana
Taşköprü Pompioupoli, Pompeiopolis, Sebaste, Πομπηιούπολις
Tosya Dokeia, Theodosia, Zoaka, Doccia, Tukıya

Kayseri Province
Akkışla: Kuzugüden
Uzunçayır: Manağoz, Manavos
Gümüşsu: Kötüköy, Nurvana, Norvana
Kesdoğan: Kastağon, կաստաղօն
Bünyan: Sarımsaklı, Bünyan-ı Hamid, Bünyanıhamid
Akçatı Karacüvek, Karacafenk, Karacahevenk, Karacavenk
Akmescit Zerezek, Arasaksa, Sarasaksa
Asmakaya Veziryurdu, Beypınarı, Dizgeme
Büyük Bürüngüz Ulubürüngüz, Büyükbürüngüz, Bürüngüz
Dağardı Ermin
Danişmend Gigi
Doğanlar Kerkeme, Gergeme
Ekinciler Zek, Dzag
Emirören Emirviran
Girveli Kirveli
Kahveci Boğazkışla
Köprübaşı Ekrek
Samağır Samağar
Sıvgın Şıvgın
Topsöğüt Taçın, Tacin
Yenisüksün Süksün
Yünören Kölete
Develi: Everek, Averak, Averag, Zengibar, Davalu, Davalı, Dev Ali, Gabadonía
Develi: Davalu, Dev Ali, Davalı
Everek: Averak, Averag, Evereg, Gabadonía
Feneze: Finas, Fenesse
Çaylıca: Girenit, Krínita
Gömedi: Gömede, Kómmata
Çukuryurt: Çuxuri
Gümüşören: Phalakron
Yaylacık: Kiskissós, Kiskíssê
Büyükkünye: Kine
Zile: Zela, Zila
Reşadiye: Aygösten, Agiostan, Ayagosin, Ay Kosten, Ayakostan, Aya Konstantinos, Agios Konstantinos, Ayos Konstantinos
Kızık: Gereme Harabeleri, Korama
: Gezbel
: Sendiremmeke
: Girenit
: Tsouhouri, Tzouhouri, Çukurköy
: Fırakdın, Fraktin, Frakdin, Phalakroû Kástron, Phálakron
: Hostsa, Hotztza, Hotztzas
: Punku
: Satıköy, Sati, Satis
: Sindala, Sindeli, Sendeli, Sendil, Sandal, Senedli
: Bakırdağı, Tastsi
: Kiske, Kiliske, Kisge, Kiska, Kiskissos, Kiskisse
: Madazı, Mátaza
: Kazlıgömedi, Gömedi
: Zela, Zila
Felahiye: Rumdiğin, Rumdigin, Rumdiken, Rumdekin
İncesu: Sadogara
İsbalı: Spíli
Süksün: Saccasena, Sakkasêna
Kayseri: Mazaka, Masaka, Mazaca, Majik, Majika, Eusebia, Eusebeía, Caesarea, Caesareia, Kaesarea, Kaisareia, Kaisariyah, Kaisariya, Kayserya, Gaser, Yaser 
Kocasinan
Akçatepe: Dadasun, Dadassós
Kemer: Kamoulianai, Kamoúliana
Emmiler: Iustinianoupolis, Nova
Erkilet: Archalla, Arxelaïs, Arxelaïda, Arkhelaos
Boğazköprü: Kampai, Campae
Güneşli: Mundassós
Buğdaylı: Horsana
Çavuşağa: Barsama
Vatan: Vartan
Yemliha: Yemilixa, Iamblikhos
Kalkancık: Kalkancık Hüyük, Ochras
Melikgazi
Ağırnas: Ayii Anargyri, Aragene, Arágena, Aragenás, Agioi Anargyroi, Taşören
: Kermira, Karmiria, Karmir, Konaklar, Garmir, Garmrag
Gesi: Kesi, Gezi, Bağyurdu, Kási, Kassiani
Bağpınar: İspidin, Ispıdın, Isbıdın, Spáthion
Bahçeli: Efkere, Efxaría
Güzelköy: Nize
Kayabağ: Darsiyak, Taksiarhis, Taksiyarhis
Özlüce: Vekse, Békse, Βέξε
Gürpınar: Salkoma
Mimarsinan: Cırlavuk
Sarımsaklı: Sérmusa
Subaşı: Üsgübü, İskopi, İsgobi, Skopí, Episkopi
: Aydınlar, Tavlosun, Tavlasoun, Tavlasun, Taurassós
Turan: Dimitri, Dimitre
Yeşilyurt: Mancusun, Mancısın, Mancısun, Muncusun
Özvatan: Sirfe, Çukur, Kaleköy, Sirixa, Syrixa
Pınarbaşı: Aziziye, Zamantı, Dzamıntav, Dsamındav, Simandu, Tsamandos, Samantos
Örenşehir Viranşehir, Karnalis, Comaralis
Zamantı: Dzamıntav, Tzamandós
Güney: Kars
: Ariarathia, Ariarátheia, Yabanlı Pazarı, Pazarviran
Şerefiye Astemirey
Sarıoğlan
: Pelas, Palaz
Sarız: Köyyeri, Sarıöz, Koduzalaba, Sabalassós, Sarûs, Sáros, Σάρος 
Talas: Dalassa, Moutaláskê, Moutalaski, Δάλασσα
Başakpınar: İsbile, Spilia
Endürlük: Endirlik, Androníkion, Adroniki, Androniki
Reşadiye: İstefana, Stefana
Zincidere: Taksiarxis, Flavianá
Tomarza: Dumarza, Köstere, Göstere, Kyzistra, Gizistara
Kapıkaya: Persek, Parseği, Aziz Parseğ Vasil
: Taf, Özlüce
Yahyalı: Yahya Ali, Gazibenli
: Avlağı, Torun
: Divriği, Divriğiçakır, Divrikçakırı
: Faraşa, Farasa, Fharasa, Pharasa, Varasos, Barasos, Bárassos, Peras, Farason, Varsak
: Mátaza, Karamadazı
: Kalınkilise, Kalınkise, Galınkise
: Barazama
Yeşilhisar: Kuvistra, Kyzistra, Develi Karahisar, Karahisar-ı Develü, Deve, Kara Hisar, Karahisar
: Arapsin
: Potamya
: Gördeles
: Erdemesin, Ardamason, Atramyssós, Artemísion, Erdemez, Edrimiz
: Kesteliç, Kastélitsa
: Mavrucan, Mavırcan, Maurídion, Mavro Han
: Kyzistra, Gizistara, Zengibar Kalesi
: Tıras, Tırxaz, Tırhaz, Troxós, Trohos
: Sindel
: Soandós
: Eğrikale, Eğriköy

Kırıkkale Province
Kırıkkale: Sarmalius
Bahşılı Bahşili, Bahçeli
Çamlıca Hodar
Balışeyh Ballı
Sorsavuş Sorsovus, Borissos, Eccobriga, Eçelriga, Ecobrogis, Ecobriga
Keskin Ciscissus, Cissus, Denek Madeni, Denek Keskini, Denik Keskini, Kokison
Gülkonak Maşat
Köprü Köprüköy, Çaşnigir Derbendi
Sulakyurt Şıh Şami Kebir, Yukarı Şamlı, Yukarışamı, Şeyhşami-i Kebîr, Yukarı Şıh Şami, Yoharışışamı
Deredüzü Kabul, Gabul, Gabil, Kabil
Yeşilyazı Aşağı Şıh Şami

Kırklareli Province
Babaeski Baba-yı Atik, Boulgarophygon
Alpullu Alpiya, Şekerköy
Demirköy Samakovcuk, Malak Samokov, Samakovo, Samokov, Samakov, Samacovo
Armutveren Paspala
İğneada Iniada, Ineada, İneada, Thynias, Niada, Thynius
Kırklareli Kırkkilise, Saranta Ekklesiai, Kırk Kilisse, Saranta, Lozengrad
Çukurpınar Sazara
Üsküp Skopòs, İskit, Yüzküp, Küçük Üsküp
Kofçaz Keşirlik
Lüleburgaz Arkadiapolis, Arkadiopolis
Pehlivanköy Pavliköy
Pınarhisar Beykar Hisar, Brysis
Yenice Skepastos, Develiyenice
Vize Bizye, Viza, Vizye, Vizyi
Kıyıköy Midye, Mideia, Medeia, Medea, Salmidessus, Salmydessos, Salmydissos, Salmydessus, Salmudassa, Salma Hisar, Almydissos, Almydessos, Σαλμυδησσός, Αλμυδησσός, Μήδεια, Мидия
Kömürköy Peneka, Pineka, Pineke

Kırşehir Province
Kırşehir Province Ahiyuva
Akçakent Axca Köy, Oxcanlı, Şehricedit, Şehir Cedit, Sıtma
Çiçekdağı Mecidiye, Boyalık
Kaman Zama, Chmamane, Şaman, Geomagen, Xamanene
Kırşehir Mokissos, Makissos, Macissus, Mocissus, Mokisos, Mokessos, Macis, Sarvenis, Aqua Saravernae, Justinianopolis, Jüstinianopolis, Parnassos, Kır Şehri, Gül Şehri, Kirchehir
Çayağzı Cemele
Keskin: Maden, Denek Madeni
Mucur Mücrim, Mücürüm, Bücür, Bucur, Mıcır, Muvur
Bayramuşağı: Kuşaklı, Soanda
Altınyazı Aflak, Aflak Baba, Eflak

Kilis Province
Elbeyli Alimantar, Til Hebeş
Kilis Kyrros, Cyrrhus, Kil'she, Kilise, Ekklisia, Killiz, Kilizi, Ciliza Sive Urmagiganti, Ciliza Sive Urnagiganti
Öncüpınar Tibil
Musabeyli Murat Höyük, Gire Murad, Tile Mired, Tile Mıret, Murathöyüğü, Murathüyüğü
Polateli Güldüzü, Ispanak
Belenözü Belenviran, Ravanda, Ravandan, er-Ravendan, Ravendel, Ravandal, Ravenel, Aréventan

Kocaeli Province
Kocaeli Province Kocaili
İzmit Nikomidia, Nikomedya, Nicomedia, Nikomedia, Nikomideia, Nikumidya, İznikmid, İzmid, İznukumid, Νικομήδεια
Akmeşe Armaş, Ermeşe, Armağan Şah, Armash
Yenidoğan: Manastır, Ayios Panteleimon
Gündoğdu: Mixalitsa
Başiskele Astakoz, Olbia, Astacus, Ἀστακός
Bahçecik Bardizag, Partizak, Astakos
Yeniköy: Eribolon, Neochori
Çayırova Güzeltepe, Ak Kilise
Darıca Algiala, Daritzion, Daritsion, Tararion, Tararitis, Dridje, Işıklar, Risio, Aretsou
Bayramoğlu Üç Burunlar
Derince Manastır
Gölcük Diolkides
Hisareyn: Kilyos, Kilyoros
Dilovası Libyssa
Gebze Dakibyza, Gekbuze, Geğivize, Dacibyza, Gekivize, Kibyza
Kandıra, Kéndri, Kándora
Karamürsel Prainetos, Praenetos, Mürsellü
Kartepe Kel Tepe
Maşukiye Voçbe 
Körfez Yarımca
Hereke Xereke, Xáraks, Xarakía, Xaraks
Ereğli: Herakleion

Konya Province
Akören Akviran, Avren
Çatören Eksile
Kayasu May
Orhaniye Üsküse, Üçkilise, Dinorna
Akşehir Philomelium, Philomelion, Belde-i Beyza, Akşar, Filomelio, Falumi, Ahşar, Ahşehir, Thymbrion, Filomidi, Filomini, Filomellon, Φιλομήλιον, Antioch of Pisidia
Savaş Permata, Bermende
Altınekin Zıvarık, Zivarik, Zavarık, Savarak, Sıvarak, Swrak, Congustus, Kongoustos, Congussus, Congusso
Oğuzeli: Anzoulada
Koçaş: Zulmandarhanı, Solmanda, Zemruta
Beyşehir Karallia, Skleros, Klaudiokaisareia, Claudiocaesarea, Mistheia, Mistea, Mistya, Kasai, Casae, Viranşehir, Süleymanşehir, Mysthia, Káralis, Karalia, Beğşehr, Beyşehri
Fasıllar Fazıllar, Göçükebir, Místheia, Mistya
Gökçimen Ararım, Gurgurum
Gölyaka Hoyran, Xoyran, Xoriane, Agrinos, Egrinas, Kubadabad, Şarköy
Adaköy: Taspa
Bozkır İsaurya, Isaura Vetus, Isauria, Isaura Palaea, İsaura Nova, İzor, Leontopolis, Sırıstat, Siristat, Siristad, Silistat, Seriustat, Sibristada, Zengibar
Cihanbeyli Esbikeşan, İnevi, Esbkeşan, Mürseliefendi
Insuyu: Pillitokome
Hodoğlu: Azak, Pegella
Gölyazı: Dondurma, Xalikanlı
Günyüzü: Kethuda
Yeniceoba (Înçowê)
Kütükuşağı (Kutigo)
Yapalı (Qemera)
Zaferiye: 
Kuşça (Hacilaro)
Kirikkişla (Molikan)
Zaferiye (Qayisole)
Beyliova (Xereve)
Yünlükuyu (Yoyle Hacomeran)
Yeşildere (Zozana Mewlîd)
Böğrüdelik (Reşadiye)
Turanlar (Yaylê Tozê)
Korkmazlar (Delala)
Bulduk (Gûnde pîr Bulduk)
Sağlık (Kolita)
Gölyazi (Xalko)
Günyüzü (Çudika)
Büyükbeşkavak (Beşkavaka Mazen)
Küçükbeşkavak (Beşkavaka piçûk)
Çöl köyü (Yaylê Çolê)
Çumra Çemre
Gökhüyük Tımraş
Çeltik:
Gökpınar: Tolastochora
Derbent Tatlarhisarı, Tatlar Derbendi
Doğanhisar Doğanhisarı, Doğankalesi, Metyos, Meteos
Başköy Ruis, Ruus
Emirgazi Arısama, Ardistana, Ardistama
Ereğli Heraclea Cybistra, Irakleia Kybistra, Herakle, Hêrákleia, Arakliyya, İrakle, Eregle, Eregli, Eregliyye, Erkili
Güneysınır Elmasun
Aydoğmuş Dorla, Isaura Nea, Isaura Nova, Isaura Nea
Hadim Hadım
Bağbaşı Eğiste, Egiste, Eyiste
İğdeören Holuslar
Korualan Gezlevi
Sarnıç Sahninç
Yalınçevre Gerez, Geres
Yenikonak Çuna
Halkapınar Zanapa, Zengi, Anari, Sannabádes 
Büyükdoğan Sinandi, Sinnuwanda
Çakıllar Çakalköy
İvriz Aydınkent, Tyana Herekleia
Kayasaray Mindos, Mundas
Küsere Kösere, Köstere
Yayıklı Nernek
Ilgın: Lageina, Tyriaion, Tyraion
Karapınar Hyde, Karabinar, Sultaniye
Karatay:
İpekler: Perta
Beşağıl: Kanna, Kana
Yağlibayat: Soatra, Savatra, Savatr
Zencirli: Salarama
Hüyük Höyük, Kıreli Hüyüğü, Öyük
Ilgın Lágaina, Hüdâî Hamamı, Germ, Ab-ı Germ, Ilgun
Kadınhanı Saideli, Saidili, Pithoi, Pira
Sarıkaya: Andeira
Saçıkara: Toprakkale, Senzousa
Kolukisa: Keissia
Dokuzath: Atlantı, Aralla
Demiroluk: Kındıras, Kindyria
Yunak:
Beşışıklı: Ouetissos, Ouetiston, Vetissus
Kulu:
Yeşilyurt: Atkafası, Plomma
Sarıyayla: Samsam
Karapınar Sultaniye
Akören Akviran, Leşkeri
Hotamış Şuğur, Otanás, Otanáda
İslik Elislik
Oymalı Gicen
Konya Ikonio, Iconium, Iconion, İkonyum, Konia, İkónion, Ικόνιον, Kawana
Meram
Gökyurt Gilisıra, Gilisra, Kilisra, Kilistra, Klistra, Lystra
Hatunsaray Lisdra, Lysdra, Lystra, Listra
Yeşildere Detse, Kuzağıl
Selçuklu
Sille Sylli, Sylle, Silen, Silene, Silenos
Eğribayat: Caballucome
Sızma: Zizima
Sarayönü Sarayini, Bardaetta
Çeşmelisebil: Gdanmaa, Ekdaumaua, Ecdaumava, Ecdaumana, Egdava
Ladik: Laodikeia, Katakekaumene, Claudiolaodicea
Seydişehir Trogitis, Medine-i Sani, Seyyid Şehri
Bostandere Vasada, Ousada
Çatmakaya Arvana
Gökçehüyük Dalisandos, Dalisandus, Δαλισανδός
Gölyüzü Suberde, Süberde
Irmaklı Evreği
Kavak Amblada 
Ketenli Çalmanda, Çalmanta
Kızılca Amblada
Kumluca Bağra
Madenli Keçili, Elmesut
Mesudiye Yanekin
Muradiye Manastır
Tepecik Rumdigin, Rumtigin
Yaylacık Nuzumla
Taşkent Pirlerkondu, Pirlevganda
Balcılar Alata, Elita
Tuzlukçu Üründüz, Örendüz, Tozlukçu
Yunak:
Harunlar: Arra
Turgut: Klaneos
Kuzören: Selmena

Kütahya Province
Kütahya Province Germiyan
Altıntaş Soa, Kurtköy, Kürtköy, Kurt Köy, Kürt Köy, Kurtköyü, Kürtköyü, Kurt Köyü, Kürt Köyü
Pınarcık Abya, Abiye, Apia, Appia
Aslanapa Gireği
Çavdarhisar Aizonai, Aizanoi, Aezani, Aizaneiton, Penkalas
Domaniç Domanítios, Domanitis
Dumlupınar Dondupınar
Emet Emed, Amita, Akrokos, Eğrigöz, Tiberiopolis
Gediz Gedüs, Gedos, Kádoi, Kodis, Kadus, Kadi, Kadohnon
Kütahya Kioutacheia, Kotyaion, Kotiyon, Cotyaeum, Kotyáeion, Kotyeíon, Kotuaeon, Kotyaioum, Kotiaeion, Cotiaeion, Kotiaeon, Cotiaeum, Koti, Kutaia
Simav Synáos, Synaus, Ansır
Dağardı Gebeler, Gebeli, Kebeli 
Şaphane Abşeker, Maden-i Şab
Tavşanlı Harguş, Tavışanlı

Malatya Province
Akçadağ Arga, Argan, Arha, Arca
Gürkaynak Kelan
Kepez Kürecik
Levent Levend
Arapgir Daskuza, Mutmur, Arabraces, Arabrakis, Arabkîr, Erebgir, Arapkir, Arabgir
Taşdelen Mutmur
Arguvan Tahir, Argaoún, Argaun, Argaous, Argaós, Argavan, Argawan, Argawana, Erguvan, Arxawun, Arxawan, Erxewan
Akören Gavurören, Gavurveren, Ağveren, Gavran
Armutlu Kuşu
Bozburun Direcan, Parçikan, Perçikan, Barçikan
Çayırlı Arakel
Çevreli Musu
Ermişli Germişi
Eymir Eğmir, Eymür
Güngören Kadabela, Kadan
Karababa Mamahar, Mamar
Şotik Çobandere, Şutık
Koçak Mamusa
Kuyudere Minayik, Mıneyik
Tarlacık Ektir, Etkir, Yitkir
Yamaç Mışedi
Yazıbaşı Nermikan, Narmikan
Battalgazi Eskimalatya
Bulutlu İspendere, Spîndarê, Ispendereya
Darende Timelkia, Tiranda, Tiryandafil, Derindere, Derende, Táranta, Dálanda, Daranda, Taranda
Balaban Gerimter, Kerimter, Germeter, Yumurta
Doğanşehir Zipetra, Muhacir, Viranşehir, Harapşehir
Doğanyol Keferdiz, Keferdis, Kefersut, Kefersük, Keferviz
Yalınca Tilmo, Telmo
Hekimhan Hekim Hanı, Han-ı Hekim
Uğurlu Baltacıbaşı, Baltacıyan
Boğazgören Çırzı, Şırzı, Şirzi
Güzelyurt Cüzüngüt
Kale İzollu, İzoli
Kuluncak Tersakan, Tirsekan, Ayvalı
Malatya Melitene, Melita, Meldiya, Malatia
Pütürge Şiro, Şero, Mirün, Mürün, İmrun, Mırün, Pötürge, Butylka, Budulga, Poturice, Poturce
Tepehan Sinan, Îrun, Eyrun
Yazıhan Patrikhan, Fethiye
Yeşilyurt Çırmik, Çirmik, Çırmıhtı, Çırmıktı

Manisa Province
Manisa Province Saruhan
Ahmetli Mostene, Mostini
Akhisar Thyateira, Thyatira, Thuateira, Pelopia, Polonya, Ohipko, Semiramis, Aspro Kastro
Alaşehir Filadelfiya, Filavya, Filedelfiye, Philadelphia, Φιλαδέλφεια
Belenyaka Karsala, Kara Sulak
Ilgın Tyriaion
Işıklar Hotallı, Xotallı
Kemaliye Mendehorya, Mendexorya, Pentexoriá
Narlıdere Elemli
Demirci
İcikler Sidas, Sıdas, Saittae, Saittai, Saittes, Σαίτται
Gölmarmara Ierokaisareia, Marmaracık, Mermere, Mermercik, Maiboza, Iulia Maionia
Gördes Gördüs, Górdos, Górdois, Julia Gordes, Guerdez, Köritöz, Kördost
Kırkağaç Khliara
Bakır Nakrason
Bostancı Yortan
Gelembe Kalánda, Kalamos, Kalandos, Başgelembe, Başgelenbe, Başgerdek, Başgirdek, Gelenbe
İlyaslar Nakrasa, Tibbe
Siledik Stratonikeia, Stratonicea, Indi, Hadrianapolis, Siledos
Kula Yanıkyöre, Katakekaumene, Katekekaumene, Yanık Yöre, Opsikion, Opsician Theme, Thema Opsikiou, Obsequium, Koula
İncesu Kólida, Goloida, Collyda, Gölde
Gökçeören Menye, Meonya, Maionia
Yurtbaşı Davala, Tabala, Devealan
Manisa Magnesia, Mahnisa
Şehzadeler
Belenyenice Karsala
Salihli Veled-i Salih, Salihoğlu, Evlâd-ı Salih
Adala Karataş, Satalá
Sart Sartmahmut, Sart Mahmutbey, Sardes, Sardis, Σάρδεις, Sardeis, Sparda, Sfard, Swarda
Sindel Sindala
Sarıgöl Callatebus, Calletebus, Kallatebos, İnegöl
Saruhanlı
Halitpaşa Papazlı, Hyrcanis, Hyrkaneis, Hyrcania, Ὑρκανία
Selendi Silinti, Selinti, Slandos, Selondos, Silandós
Karaselendi Silinti, Slandos, Selondos, Silandós
Soma Sumak, Somak
Darkale Tarhala, Traxoula, Bubeyler
Duğla Doğla, Tuğla, Diokleia
Turgutlu Kasaba, Cassaba, Casaba, Troketta, Caesareia Troketta, Turgut, Turgutoğlu, Durkutlu
Irlamaz Ermanas, Ormenos, Ορμενος

Mardin Province
Dargeçit Kerburan, Kerboran, Kher-Boran, Kfar-Boran
Kumdere Şibebi, Şibibi, Şibebiye
Derik Derike, Al-Malkyea
Alagöz Bakustan, Baqisyan, Beth Kustan
Kızıltepe Koser, Kosor, Koçhisar, Tell-Ermen, Dunaysir, Dunaysır, Telermen
Akdoğan Arada, Arade, Erad, Tell Arad
Beşdeğirmen Emrud, Amrut, Emrut, Beş Değirmen, Başdeğirmen
Şenyurt Derbesiye, Derbisiye, Derbas, Dirbesi, Deyr Besiyye, Deyr Bâsiyye
Yeşilköy Hanika Şeyha, Mağaracık
Mardin Marde, Mardie, Maridin, Merdin, Izalla, Azalzi, Azalli, Izala, Izla, Marida, Mérida, Merdo
Alımlı Bilale, Bilalya, Bilaliye
Eroğlu Hundüla, Hindula, Hindilla
Mazıdağı Şamrah, Samrah, Şemreh
Midyat Midyad, Medyad, Midyoyo, Matiate
Altıntaş Keferze, Kevirze, Kferzo, Kefirze, Herabe Kefre
Anıtlı Hah 
Bardakçı Bote, Bate, Bati
Barıştepe Salah, Shiluh, Salih, Selhê, Sulh, Sâleh, Selhî
Çayırlı Kefnas, Kevnas, Kfernas
Çörekli Denwan, Dîvanik, Kücan
Doğançay Mizizah, Mzizah, Mizizeh, Mızizeğ
Elbeğendi Kafro Eloyto, Kafro Tahtayto, Kafro, Kefre Herabe, Xarabekefrî, Kafrô Taxtaytô
Gülgöze Aynvert, Ayınvert, Aynverd, Ayn Wardo, Invardo, Iwardo, Ayn Verd, Inwardo, Ivardo, In Wardo, Ayin Warda, Ain Wardo, Evert, Everd, Eynverd
Güven Bacin, Bacinê, Bâcinne
İzbırak Zaz, Zaze, Zazabukha
Yayvantepe Kartmin, Qartmin, Kertmin
Yemişli Anhel, Hilhil, Enhil, Anhil, Bethnahle, Bethnahrin
Nusaybin Naşibina, Nisibis, Nisivis, Nşibin, Şoba, Mtsbin, Nisebin, Nisibin, Netzivin, Antiochia Mygdonia, Nırbo, Armis, Nabila, Kenge, Nas-ü-bina, Meppin-Suba, Antimosya, Nasibina-Sarbo, Ahvaz, Nasibeyn
Çilesiz Mezre,  Mezre Mihoka, Mrze, Mezrik
Değirmencik Qolika, Qolka, Kolika, Kölika
Durakbaşı Serçehan, Serçe-Hanı, Sercehan, Sercihan, Zircihan, Sargathon, Kasır, Qesra, Sercihan Kasrı, Sercehan Kasrı
Güneli Geliye Sora, Geli Sora, Gelisoran
Kalecik Keleha Bunisra, Keleya Bunisra, Kale, Keleh, Kela Bünüsra
Kaleli Efshe, Efşê, Hepşê, Evşî, Auşe
Mağaracık Hanika Şeyha
Taşköy Arbo, Arboy
Sürmeli Dera Çomara, Dera Çomera, Deyrçomer, Derçömer
Toruntepe El Helif, El Halif, Tilefle, Tel Helif, Tel Halif
Ömerli Maserti, Mehsert, Ma'asarte
Savur Stevre, Stevr, Stewr, Savr, Savro, Şuara, Suara
Dereiçi Kıllıt, Qıllıth, Qilit, Qillit, Qiltê, Qillitê, Cyrrhe, Killis, Kellef
Kırkdirek Çılsütun, Çilstun, Kırdilek
Yeşilli Rişmil
Sancar Tuhube, Tihub

Mersin Province
Mersin Province İçel, İçil, Zefirya
Anamur Anemurium, Anemourion, Anemuryum
Anıtlı Kaledran, Kaliteran, Kaledıran, Xáradrous, Kálandros 
Aydıncık Gilindire, Gilindere, Kelenderis, Celenderis, Chelendreh, Celindre, Celindere, Scilindra, Kalendria, Kelendri, Kelendere, Kelenderi, Kilindra, Kelendiri, Kilindria, Kilinderis, Glindere, Gelendir, Gilindir
Yenikaş Manyan, Melanya, Melania, Kaşobası
Bozyazı Bozalan, Bozova, Nagidos, Νάγιδος, Nagidus
Akcami Küçük Manastır
Denizciler Bidi
Gürlevik Gürleyük
Kaledibi Fidikli
Karaisalı Karasilli
Kömürlü Büyük Manastır
Narince Narınca
Paşabeleni Nagidos
Softa Kalesi Suhte Kalesi, Arsinóê, Sikiya, Sikiberd
Çamlıyayla Namrun, Lambron, Lampron, Les Embruns, İllubru, İllibru
Çayırekinliği Sinap Kalesi, Sinap Castle
Erdemli Erdemoğlu
Ayaş Elaioússa, Elaiussa Sebaste, Elaeousa Sebaste, Elaiousa Sebasti
Aydınlar Avgadı, Avkadı
Kanlıdivane Canytelis, Kanytelis, Kanytelleis, Neapolis
Karaahmetli İmirzeli, Emirzeli
Kızkalesi Kız Kalesi, Corycus, Korykos, Corycos, Ghorgos
Kumkuyu Tırtar, Ömmen
Limonlu Antiochia Lamotidos, Lamousia, Lamis, Lamos, Lamas
Gülnar Anaypazarı, Eyne Pazarı, İnebazar, İnepazar
Ardınçpınarı İlibas, İlivas, Elibaş, Ellibaş, Libas
Arıkuyusu Alakilise
Çukurkonak Uluhatu, Uluhtu
Demirözü Hortu
Yanışlı Babadıl, Babadul, Papadula, Papadoúla
Zeyne Sütlüce
Mersin Mersini, Myrsine, Zephyrion, Zephyrium, Hadrianopolis,  Mersina, Zefirya, Zefyrion
Akdeniz
Bağcılar-İhsaniye Melemez
Mezitli Mezitoğlu
Viranşehir Soloi, Soli, Solipolis, Pompeiopolis, Pompeioupolis, Pompeipolis
Mut Claudiopolis, Claudiopolis in Isauria, Klaoudiópolis, Ninica, Ninica Claudiopolis, Colonia Iulia Felix Augusta Ninica, Mud
Alahan Apadnos, Koca Kale
Ballı Aleksi, Eleksi
Barabanlı Balabanlı
Çamlıca Beci
Çampınar Kahtama, Kahdama
Çınarlı Çakallı
Dağpazarı Kastel, Coropissus
Değirmenlik Balabolu, Balapoğlu, Palaiópolis, Adrassós
Dereköy Dereli
Derinçay Hocantı, Hoca Enti
Elmapınar Navdalı
Esençay Karabelalı
Evren Kıptiyan
Geçimli Malya
Gençali Genceli
Gökçetaş Şanşa, Sekitler
Göksu Kravga, Kıravga
Ilıca İlice
Işıklar Malhoca
Karacaoğlan Çukur
Kırkkavak Kırkyalan
Kurtuluş Oyladin
Kürkçü Sarıkavak
Özlü Dorla
Topkaya Gille
Topluca Perakende
Tuğrul Doğrul
Yıldızköy Masara
Yukarıköselerli  Kulfalı
Silifke Seleukeia, Seleucia ad Calycadnum, Seleucia on the Calycadnus, Seleucia in Cilicia, Seleucia of Isauria, Seleucia Trachea, Seleucia Tracheotis, Selefkos, Selefkia Trachaiotis, Σελεύκεια
Atakent Susanoğlu, Korasion
Aya Tekla Ayatekla, Hagia Thecla, Hagia Thékla,  Aya Thecla, Aya Thekla, Ἁγία Θέκλα
Narlıkuyu Nuus, Porto Calamie
Cennet and Cehennem Paperon
Taşucu Holmi, Olmoi, Holmoi, Ağa Liman, Ak Liman, Ağalar, Aya Tekla, Agia Thekla
Uzuncaburç Recepli, Olba, Diocaeserea
Yeşilovacık Hacı İsaklı, Hacıisaklı, Aphrodisias, Afrodisyas, Tisan, Porto Cabalieri, Porto Cavaliere
Tarsus Tarşa, Tarsa, Tarsos, Tarsisi, Antiochia on the Cydnus, Antiocheia tou Kydnou, Antiochia ad Cydnum, Juliopolis, Darson, Tarson, Tersun
Gülek Kuklak, Kavlak, Kawlāk, Hins Bwls, Panzinçukuru, Yaylaçukuru

Muğla Province
Muğla Province Menteşe
Bodrum Halikarnas, Halikarnassos, Halicarnassus, Petrium, Petrum, Potrum
Aspat Aspartos, Strobilos, Çıfıt Kale, Çıfıt Kalesi, İsravolos, İsravalos, Sıravalos, Sıravolos, Ser-ulus, Sarıulus, Cühudluk Limanı, Sralavos, Serulus 
Çiftlik Theangela
Türkbükü Farilya, Varilye
Yalıkavak Madnasa, Aşağı Sandama, Sandama İskelesi
Dalaman Pırnaz, Çakallık, Muhacirin-i Çakallık, Talaman, Dalamanî, Talamanî, Lamianoi
Şerefler Kozpınar, Kalynda, Calynda, Calinda, Calydna, Karynda, Κάλυνδα, Calydna
Datça Akanthos, Nea Knidos, Dadya, Dadiya, Dadye, Tadya, Stádia, Stadea, Statea, Statia, Tadya, Tadiya, Dadça, Ντάτσα, Στάδια
Akbük Armalida Bükü
Eski Datça Dadya, Dadiya, Dadia, Dadye, Dadça, Daçça, Tadya, Stádia, Stadea, Statea, Statia, Tadya, Tadiya, Traxeía, Ντάτσα, Στάδια
Hızırşah Bat, Batır, Baderna
Mesudiye Avlana
Ovabükü Kato Georgios, Aşağı Yorgo
Palamutbükü Kumlu, Epano Georgios, Yukarı Yorgo
Reşadiye Alaköy, Alagi, Elaki, Allaki, Agaki
Sındı Örencik
Yeni Datça (İskele) İskele Mahallesi, İncebük, İstarya
Fethiye Meğri, Makri, Macre, Mekri, Megri, Marki, Macre, Macra, Macri, Macari, Telmessos, Telmissos, Telemessis, Telmesso, Thelmisse, Telebehi, Quvalapasa, Anastasyopolis, Μάκρη, Μάκρης, Φετίγιε, Φετχιγιέ, Τελμησσός, Tελμισός, Αναστασιούπολις
Belceğiz Belcekız, Belces, Ölüdeniz İskelesi, Πελτζιάζι
Eldirek Elli Direk, Eldelek
Foça Günlükbaşı
Göcek Kalimche, Kallimache, Callimache, Hyparna, Köycek, Göçek, Köçek, Köcek, Köycük, Gökçe, Paterson's Wharf, Γιοτζέκ, Κιουτζέκι
İnlice Daídala, Daydala
Kayaköy Livissi, Lebessos, Lebessus, Leivissi, Λιβίσι, Λειβίσσι, Λεβίσσι, Λιβίσι της Μάκρης, Καγιάκιοϊ
Keçiler Geçitler
Kınalı Afkula, Af Kula, Afkule, Af Kule, Ayos Lefteris Manastırı, Agios Elefthérios, Manastır, Molino-Manastır, Fineli
Nif Arpacık, Nympheion
Ölüdeniz Symbola, Symbolon, Simbalon, Simbalu, Simbola, Sybola, Port of Levisey, Blue Lagoon, Σίπολος, Σύμπολο, Έμβολο, Ολούντενίζ
Söğütlü Gürme, Sekiz
Uzunyurt Faralya, Farilya, Fareli, Fareli Asar, Fariliya, Paralya, Perdicia, Perdikiai, Perdiciis, Artymnissos, Camiyeri
Yakacık Boynuz, Keçiboynuzu
Yanıklar Yangınlar
Yaylakoru Koru, Mesaniz, Mersenis, Merseniz
Yediburunlar Gey
Yeşilüzümlü Üzümlü, Cadyanda, Kadyanda, Kadawanti, Xadawãti, Cadianda, Cadiwati, Καδύανδα
Kavaklıdere
Çayboyu Mesevle, Mesavli, Laryma, Hyllárima
Köyceğiz Yüksekkum 
Marmaris Fiskos, Fisko, Physcus, Physkos, Physkos, Fyskos, Fiskus, Mermeris, Marmaras, Marmaros, Marmaritsa, Marmarida, Μαρμαρίδα, Φύσκος
Adaköy Nimara
Armutalan Armudalanı
Asarcık Amos, Samos
Aziziye Karamaka
Bayırköy Syrma, Syrna
Beldibi Belendibi
Bozburun Timnos, Tymnos, Thymnia, Μπόζμπουρουν, Τύμνος
Bozukkale Larimna, Loryma, Larymna, Larumma, Lorymna, Oplothika, Aplothíki, Aplotheka, Oplasika Bükü
Cumhuriyet Saranda, Saránta, Thyssanus, Thyssanous, Θυσσανούς
Çamlı Gelibolu, Gelibolucuk, Kallípolis
Çetibeli Çete Beli
Hisarönü Asarönü, Eríne
Bozburun Mevkii, Hisarönü Bybassós, Boubastós, Bybassus, Bybassos, Bubassus, Bubassos, Bybasstum, Bybasston, Bybastium, Bybastion, Bubastus, Βυβάστιον, Βυβασσός, Βύβασστον
Pazarlık Mevkii, Hisarönü Kestabos, Kastabos, Castabus, Κάσταβος
İçmeler Gölenye, Kolônía, Colonia
Orhaniye Kirvasil, Kyr Vassili, Aulai
Osmaniye Aleksa, Alekse, Alakilise
Selimiye Losta, Hydas, Kızılköy
Higasos Mevkii Ὑγασσέως, Hygassos
Serçe Limanı Krêssa Limên
Söğütköy Darahya, Traxeîa, Daraxya
Taşlıca Fenaket, Finikúdi, Phoinikoúdi, Phoiniks, Phoenix, Phoinix, Phoenice, Phoinike, Φοινίκη, Φοῖνιξ
Asardibi Mevkii, Taşlıca Casara, Casarea, Kasara
Turgutköy Elia, İliya, Eleia
Turgut İskelesi Pealos
Turunç Turunç Bükü
Kumlubük Ἄμος, Amos
Yeşilbelde Darıyüzü, Dereözü
Milas Mylasa, Melas, Μύλασα
Beçin Mutluca, Peçin, Becîn, Omba, Panagia Petsona, Petsona
Boğaziçi Bargilya, Bargila, Bargylia, Βαργυλία
Çökertme Fesleğen Bükü, Vasiliko
Gökbel Pargasa, Bargasa, Βάργασα, Πάργασα
Güllük Kulluk
Kapıkırı Herakleia, Heraklia, Latmus, Latmos, Heraklia ad Latmos, Herakleia Latmos, Heracleia by Latmus, Heraclea in Ionia
Karacahisar Hydisos
Kıyıkışlacık Asın Kurin, Ason, Asın, Iassós, Iassón, Iasos, Ἰασός, Ἰασσός, Iasus, Iassus
Ören Kerme, Germe, Gereme, Kereme, Ceramus, Keramos, Κέραμος
Selimiye Mandalyat, Melanoúdion, Melanoudia, Euromus, Euromos, Εὔρωμος, Εὔροωμος, Europus, Europos, Εὐρωπός, Eunomus, Eunomos, Εὔνωμος, Philippi, Philippoi, Φίλιπποι, Kyromus, Hyromus
Muğla Mobolla, Mughla, Mabolla, Mogola, Mogla
Menteşe
Akkaya Dirgeme, Trygima
Çaybükü Gevenes
Yeşilyurt Pisi, Pisia, Psiye, Pisiköy
Ortaca Terzialiler
Dalyan Caunus, Caunos, Kaunos, Καύνος, Καῦνος, Khbide, Kbid
İztuzu Beach İztuzu Sahili, Kaplumbağa Plajı, Turtle Beach
Gökbel Pasanda, Πάσανδα, Πάσσανδα, Passanda
Karadonlar Evgele 
Sarıgerme Panormus, Panormos, Πάνορμος, Pisilis 
Seydikemer Seydiler (Seyidler) & Kemer
Alaçat Girdev, Girdüve, Kirdüve
Arsa Arsa, Arısu, Ársada
Boğalar Alagöz
Çayan Narlık
Çobanisa Çobansa, Çobanlar
Dodurga Dodurga Hisar, Sidima, Sidyma, Σίδυμα
Don't Donta, Esenköy
Düğer Düver, Döğer
Eşen Kestep, Kesteb
Gerişburnu Gerişburun, Girişburun
Girmeler Gebeler
Gölbent Gülmet, Gülment, Gölmend
Güneşli Zeyve, Zaviye
İncealiler İnceveliler, Oenoanda, Oinoanda, Oinounda, Οἰνόανδα, Wiyanawanda, Winuwanda
İzzettinköy Papaz, Papas, Bubas, İzzeddin
Karaman Kastabara
Kıncılar Kumcular, Kinciler
Kınık Ksantos, Ksánthos, Xanthus, Xanthos, Arñna, Ξάνθος
Kumluova Bozoğlu, Bozoluk, Letoon, Letoum, Leto, Λητώον
Minare Pınara, Pinara, Pínara, Pinale, Pinala, Pinali, Binare, Binara, Delik Asar, Artymnesus, Artymnesos, Πίναρα
Ören Aráksa, Araxa, Ἄραξα, Ağridos, Ağrıdos, Ağros
Ortaköy Bayat, Karabuynuz, Karaboynuz
Pınarcık Mersinet, Mersenet
Uğurlu Müngen
Yakaköy Tlawa, Tlos, Τλως
Ula Gökabad
Akyaka İdima
Yatağan Ahiköy, Ahırköy, Yatıgan, Yatan
Bencik Pencik
Cazkırlar Cazkırlar İslam, Cazğırlar
Çakırlar Çakırkayalar
Eskihisar Stratonikeya, Stratonikeia, Stratonicea, Στρατoνικεια, Στρατoνικη, Στρατονίκεια, Stratoniki, Stratonike, Stratonice, Hadrianopolis, Idrias, Chrysaoris
Gökpınar Girenis, Ganuş
Köklük Köklüce
Madenler Sudanlar, Elekçi
Mesken Uluçınar 
Perenlik, Bağyaka Panámara
Turgut Leyne, İleyna, İleyne, Lagina, Laginia, Λάγινα, Λαγινία, Kapıtaş, Turgud
Yenikarakuyu Zorbaz Çiftliği
Yeşilbağcılar Gibye, Gibia
Yeşilköy Cazkırlar Hıristiyan

Muş Province
Muş Province Tarawn, Taron, Daron, Taraunitis
Bulanık Kop, Gop
Erentepe Liz
Hasköy Derhas, Deyr Khas, Khasgegh, Xarts, Harts, Xars, Hars
Korkut Til, Teli, Tel, Tilcafer
Altınova Vartinis
Oğulbalı Azakpur, Avzağpür 
Malazgirt Menuahina, Kele, Manzikert, Mantzikerd, Manazkert, Manavazkert, Manavazekert, Milazgir, Milazgird, Melazkurd, Manazkert, Mandzgert, Melazgerd, Malazkert, Manazcird, Malazgird, Malazgir
Nurettin Noradin
Muş Mush, Muşa, Muşki, Mıj, Moush, Moosh
Cevizlidere Geligüzan, Geliyekozan
Donatım Tirkevank, Tirkavank
Taşoluk Akçan, Ağcan
Ulukaya Oruğ, Orih, Amara
Varto Gümgüm, Gımgım, Gimgim
Çaylar Üstükran, Üstükran Süfla, Büyük Üstükran, Uskuran, Ustukran, Uskura Pil

Nevşehir Province
Acıgöl: Dobada, Topada, Topata
Yuva: Sacasena
Kurugöl: Soandus
Tatlarin: Manávi
Avanos: Venessa, Zuwinasa, Ouenasa, Ouénassa, Venassa, Venasi, Enes, Evenez, Avano
Aktepe: Zelve
Çavuşin: Çavuşini, Kodessane
: Genezin, Knossós, Kenissós, Genezun, Genezün
Derinkuyu: Malakopi, Malakopea, Malakopia, Melekubi, Melikübi, Melegobi, Melegöbi, Melegobia, Melogobia, Melagob, Merlükübi, Melebi, Μαλακοπή
Doğala: Doara
Çakıllı: Gilediz, Giledis
Kuyulutatlar: Scolla, Chusa
Güneyce: Kerlah, Tilax
Özlüce: Civar Zile, Zeila, Zela, Silata, Σήλατα, Ζήλα
: Filidon, Phloïta, Phlogita, Flogita, Floita, Sündüs, Sundus, Sörmez
Til: Dila, Kaysar, Diokaisária
Gülşehir: Zoropassós, Arapsun, Arapsu, Arabsun, Arabusun, Arabison, Ζωρόπασος
: Sivas, Soasa, Sivasa
: Salanda, Salandós, Hısn Salandu
Gümüşyazı: Arafa
Ovaören: Göstesin, Osiena, Assiana, Uššuna
Yakatarla: Nernek, Muşkara, Nisa, Νίσα
Gümüşkent: Salanda, Salando, Salandos
Yeşilöz: Cemel
Hacıbektaş: Karahöyük, Karaöyük, Sulucakarahöyük, Doara
Yenice Engel, Engelicedit
Kozaklı: Hamamorta
Çağsak: Sacoena
: Halaka
Nevşehir: Muşkara, Seandos, Soanda, Nissa, Nyssa, Neapolis
Nar: Nyssa
Göreme: Kórama, Maçan, Matiána, Matzan, Maccan, Machan, Matiane, Avcılar
Kaymaklı: Enegi, Eneki, Anakoú, Anaku, Inegi, Enegup, Anakopi, Ene
Sulusaray: Sebastópolis
Ürgüp: Prokopi, Burgut, Başhisar, Prokópion, Hagios Prokopios, Assiana, Osíana, Ürgüb
: Aravan, Aravani, Aravanion
Bahçeli: Mumusun, Mahson, Momissós
Başdere
Başköy: Kavessos, Kabassós, Kabessós
Dereköy: Potámia, Megarissós
: Cemil, Zalela, Zelil
İbrahimpaşa: Babayan, Papagianni, Papayanni, Papa Yani
Mustafapaşa: Sinasos, Sinaso, Sinassos, Sineson, Sinason
Şahinefendi: Sövéş, Sóbesos
Taşkınpaşa: Damsa, Támisos, Ṭamisa
Yeşilöz: Tağar, Aziz Theodoros

Niğde Province
Altunhisar: Antigoús, Antigus, El-Antiqun, Antiğu, Anduğu, Anduğı, Ortaköy, Altınhisar
Çömlekçi: Hophisar, Opsar, Obsar, Athar, Korana, Koron, Korón
: Asmaz, Yukarı Asmaz
Uluören: Caena
Bor: Póros
Bahçeli: Diravun, Diragun, Didragun, Didragon, Bağçalı
Havuzlu: Baravun, Baravan
Bayat: Kınık Höyük, Dratai, Tracias
Kemerhisar: Tuvanuva, Tuwanuwa, Tuvana, Dana, Tyana, Tyanna, Thyana, Christoupolis, Hristoupolis, Kilisehisar, Kisasar
Seslikaya: Narazan, Nağrazen 
Tepeköy: Kılmanas
Çamardı: Bereketli Maden, Şamardı, Bereketlimaden, Maden, Hamidiye, Bulgar Madeni
Kayırlı: Andabilis
Gösterli: Sasima
Çiftlik: Melendiz, Malandusa, Melendos
Azatlı: Azadala
: Gelemiş, Gelemiç
Çınarlı: Cenare, Çinara, Cınara, Çınara, Çınarlıköy
Divarlı: Duvarlı, Divara, Divari, Dóara
Kitreli: Lemye, Ilemi, Lemyeli
Kula: Kulu
Murtazaköy: Murtandi, Murtandı, Murtaza
Ovalıbağ: Karamelendiz, Malandása, Malandasa
Sultanpınarı: Finas
Niğde: Nigdi, Nahita, Nakita, Nakhita, Nahitiya, Anahita, Nakida, Nekide, Nikde, Naxita, Nagida, Naqda, Macida
Aktaş: Andaval, Andabalis
Bağlama: Bavlama
: Madala, Matala, Matla
Çavdarlı: Zamzama, Zemzeme, Sasima
Çayırlı: Aytamas, Agios Thomás
Değirmenli: Bastana, Baştana
Dikilitaş: Enehil
Dündarlı: Dindarlı
Edikli: Ediği
Fertek: Fertakaina, Fertaki, Fertakion, Ferteki, Fertekion, Fertikköy, Aydın Yurt, Aydınyurt
: Küllüce, Gülüce, Remad
Gümüşler: Tracias, Eski Gümüş
Hacıabdullah: Andırlus, Andirlos, Andırlos
: Gourdonos, Kurdunos, Gurdunos, Gortyna, Gordyassós
: Tırmısın, Termessós, Telmessos, Telmisos, Dermason, Dermoson, Dilmison, Dilmusun, Dermusun, Dermeson
: Hasakopos, Aksos, Axo, Akso, Hasanköy, Hassaköy, Hasa, Sasima, Αξός, Ναξός
: Lavsan, Lafsun
: Ferhenk, Pháranks, Pháranga
Karanlıkdere: Asbuzu, Aspezinsós
: Naynas, Kırkıpınar
Konaklı: Misti, Misli, Misly, Mistli, Mysti, Mustilia, Musthilia, Moustila, Misthi, Μιστί, Μισθί, Mystília
Koyunlu: Aşağıkoyunlu, Adırmusun, Atramyssós
: Ervani, Aravan, Arvani, Varvani, Barbawa, Orbáda, Orbadon
: Eylesun, Eyleson, İylisun, İlasan, İlisun, İlison, İloson, Aliassós, Aliaşşa
Ovacık: Dásmendon, Ta Smendra, Simandra, Semendire
: Dokuzlar, Çiftlik
: Germeğan, Germegen, Germiyan
Sazlıca: Sazala
: Sasalca, Sazalca, Sazalıç, Sasalıç, Taşpınar
: Arlasun, Arlason, Arlusun, Arlison, Allussun, Andırson
: Tırxan, Troxós, Trohos, Trokhos, Trokho
: Altınhisar, Altınhisarı
: Veli İsa, Valisa, Bálbissa, Balisa
Yeşilburç: Teney, Deneği, Deneyi, Denege, Danaka, Tenegi, Teneyi, Tenegia
Yeşilgölcük: Gölcük, Limnae, Limnai
: Dimrit, Divrin, İnli
Ulukışla: Secaaddin, Hamidiye, Loulon, Lulukışla, Lulu, Lu'lu'a, Şücaeddin, Loulon Kástron
Başmakçı: Halala, Faustinopolis, Colonia Faustinopolis
Çiftehan: Aquae Calidae
Hasangazi: Lüle, Lüle Kalesi, Lu'lu'a, Lulu, Loulon, Lolas, Gümüş
Madenköy: Bolkar Madeni, Bulgar Madeni, Maden
Toraman: Beşevler
Ünlüyaka: Muradı
Yeniyıldız: Burna

Ordu Province
Akkuş Karakuş, Yazlıkbelen
Çamlıca Fartana, Alaniçi
Gökçebayır Tifi
Meyvalı Damuz
Yolbaşı Körmen, Kömran
Aybastı İbasti, İbastı, Ibasdi, Ibasda, Ibassa, Epasa, İbassa, Fidâverende, Elbey, Esenli
Çamaş Ürmeli
Çatalpınar Çatak
Çaybaşı Çilader
Fatsa Faccia, Faça, Facha, Fatsah, Fatisia, Fadisane, Fatizan, Vadisani, Vadisane, Vatiza, Phadisana, Phadisanen, Phatisane, Phadsane, Phacisane, Phádissa, Phábda, Pytane, Sidini, Fanise, Satılmış, Satılmış-ı Mezid Bey, Satılmış-ı Ferid Bey
Bolaman Polemonium, Polemon, Polemen, Polemonion, Polemonio, Polemoni
Gölköy Hapsamana, Habsamana, Hapsamina, Hapsimana, Kuşluvan, Kuşluyan
Cihadiye Manastır
Gülyalı Abulhayır, Abulhayr, Ebulhayr
Gürgentepe Hanyanı
İkizce Laleli Mabeyceli, Laleli, Laleli Beyceli
Kabadüz Karadüz
Kabataş Karay
Korgan Keşdere
Kumru Karaca, Karacalı
Yalnızdam Serkeş, Nefsi Serkeş, Nefs-i Serkeş
Mesudiye Milas, Meles, Melet, Melánthia, Melanthios, Meletios, Hamidiye, Pazaryeri, Ermenipazarı, Ermeniköyü
Topçam Gebeme
Ordu Kotyora, Kotyara, Kotiora, Cotyora
Altınordu Altın Urda, Golden Horde
Perşembe Vona, Voni, Vone, Bouná, Heneti
Ulubey Ulubeğlü
Ünye Oinòe, Oinoie, Oenoe, Oinoi, Oine, Onea, Oinaion, Unieh, Unie, Unia

Osmaniye Province
Osmaniye Province Cebelibereket, Gavurdağı
Bahçe Bulanık, Baghche
Bekdemir Bilalık
Örencik Lapaşlı
Savranlı Sarbanda, Sarbandikon Oros, Srvandak'ar, Hesno d'Serwand
Düziçi Haruniye, Harun, Harunia, Haruniya, Haronia, Xaronia, Aronia, Eirenópolis
Hasanbeyli
Kalecik Kızıldere, Savurankale, Sarvandi, Sarvandik'ar, Savranda, Sarvanda, Serfendikar, Sarvantikar, Sarvandikar, Sarvanda k'ar, Sarvandakar
Kadirli Flavias, Flaviapolis, Flaviopolis, Kars, Kars-ı Maraş, Kars-i Maraş, Kars'ul-Kadriye, Kars-ı Zül Kadriyye,  Kars-ak-eli, Pazaryeri, Kars Pazarı
Osmaniye Cebelbereket, Cebel-i Bereket, Cebelibereket
Gökçedam Hemite, Amuda, Amouda
Yarpuz Jarpus
Sumbas Smpada, Smpad

Rize Province
Ardeşen Artasheni, Ardasheni, Artaşeni, Ardaşeni, Ardışen, Art'aşeni, Tamburi
Yayla Kordule, Ok'ordule
Çamlıhemşin Vicealtı, Viçealtı, Viçedibi, Vicedibi, Vice, Vica, Vija, Vije, Vijealtı, Vijedibi, Vijadibi, Vizha, Vicakudeli, Çamlıca
Çayeli Mapavri, Mapauri, Mapaura, Çaybaşı
Fındıklı Viçe, Vitze, Vitza, Vizirikos Limni, Kissa
Sümer Sumla
Güneysu Potamya, Potamia
Hemşin Hamshen, Hamamashen, Hamamaşeni, Zuga, Zuğa, Hamşen, Hamamaşen, Hamşeni, Kale
İkizdere Dipotamos, Kuras, Kura-i Seba, Kuray-ı Sab, Kur'a-i Seba, Xuras
Demirkapı Homeze, Xomeze, Rkinis Kari
Rüzgarlı Mize, Mze
İyidere Aspet, Kalopotamo, Kalapotamos, Kaliparauli
Kalkandere Karadere
Pazar Atina, Athina
Rize Rizounta, Rhizaeum, Rhizios

Sakarya Province
Adapazarı
Adapazarı Ada Pazar
Örentepe Gümrüt
Arifiye
Kemaliye, Arifiye Hamışa
Erenler
Büyükesence Tersia, Tersiye, Tersiye-i Kebir, Tersiye Kebir, Büyük Tersiye
Ferizli Ferissium, Firuzlu, Bebrika
Sapanca Siphonensis Lacus, Buanes, Sofhan, Sofhange, Sophona, Sofona, Siphonês, Sophon
Nailiye Xeba, Kheba
Yanık Hunca Hable, Huncahable
Serdivan Petrades, Sardovan
Söğütlü
Kurudil Gusart Hable, Guserthame
Akyazı
Bedilkadirbey Balballı
Bediltahirbey Khaldaxuraa, Tahirbey
Buğdaylı Psirdzxa, İrfanisani, İrfaniye Sani
Çakıroğlu Mikâil
Düzyazı Süpran, Süpren
Erdoğdu Beydilisimo, Caferanlı
Kuzuluk Bec Yikita, Aziziye Zir
Pazarköy Law Yikita
Geyve Gekve
Alifuatpaşa Geyve İstasyonu
Bağlarbaşı Yalanda, Yılanda
Boğazköy Cıwaa Rkıta
Çamlık Arıgat, Arıkat
Hendek Handakas, Chandakas, Xandek, Han Dağı
Akçayır Şabatbey
Beyköy Puna Beyköy, Amckuay
Çakallık Khazlataa
Çukurhan Apsara
Eskibıçkı Kartla, Bıçkı Atik
Güldibi Gevli
Hüseyinşeyh Ciwaa
Karadere Simeyhe Kita
Kargalıyeniköy Urzuma
Kızanlık Arxva
Muradiye Toxveti
Ortaköy Puna, Puna Ortaköy
Pınarlı Avana, İkbaliye
Sarıyer Lakraa
Sivritepe Awublaa
Soğuksu Cgerda
Yarıca Kguaracugea
Yeniköy Taguarakg
Yeşilköy Cıpcıp
Karapürçek Ab-ı Sufî, Abısafi, Alpsofi, Aksofu, Ab-ı Safî, Karapürçek Kebir, Büyükkarapürçek, Büyük Karapürçek
Harmanlı Tsixinara, İrfanievvel, İrfaniye Evvel
Mesudiye Tsankit
Karasu İncilli
Kızılcık Aram
Konacık Edişe
Kaynarca Yena, Hocaköy, Şeyhler
Güven Canos
Yassıgeçit Keğam
Kocaali Ceharköy, Ciharköy
Gümüşoluk Belazâr, Bolazar, Bolpazar, Bolazlar
Lahna Lahana, Ortaköy
Selahiye Kobaşlar
Pamukova Tataion, Totaion, Akhisar, Akhisar-ı Geyve, Sakarya Akhisar
Fevziye Tesbine, Déspoina, Despina
Kadıköy Bednos Viranı, Betnaz Viranı
Kazımiye Kirse, Kirsiye, Kirasiye, İnkirse, İnkilise, İngirse
Kemaliye Tirse, Tirsi, Rinsel
Kurtbelen Kayleplur
Pınarlı Sondul, Sondullu
Taraklı Dablis, Daeblis, Dablais, Doris, Dablai, Yenice, Yenice-i Taraklı
Çamtepe Poliós, Bulyas, Bilyas
Uğurlu Gelemü

Samsun Province
Samsun Province Canik
Alaçam Zakellos, Zaliche, Zaliches, Zalichin, Zalikus, Zaleco, Salton, Saltos, Saltus, Leontopolis, Leontopoli, Tralköy, Uluköy, Uluçam, Zelika
Asarcık Biçincik, Biçüncük
Kesealan Kilisealan
Yeşildere Kıvrı
Ayvacık Menağri, Ayvacuk, Ayvacuklu, Acıklı
Gürçam Fatsa
Koçyurdu Zevgar
Bafra Pafra, Paúra, Üskübi, Skopía 
Çarşamba Miskire, Arım, Erim
Havza Kavuzhan, Kavza, Khavza, Ancere, Hançere, Hancere, Thermee Phoseemeomitearem, Koze, Hevze, Hevize, Havize, Simre-i Ladik, Kavissos, Kabissos
Ladik Laodicea Pontica, Laodicea, Laodíceia, Laodicaea, Laodikeias, Laodíkeia, Laodikya, Lantik
Ondokuzmayıs Engiz, Ballıca
Ormancık Ormanos
Salıpazarı
Cevizli Homa
Konakören Bolas
Samsun Amisus, Amisos, Sampsounta, Samsunta
Atakum Matasyun
Canik
İlkadım
Çatkaya Kadamut, Gadamud, Güzelpınar
Uzgur Küplüce
Tekkeköy Çerkezköy
Altınkaya Kelkaya
Antyeri Andyeri, Andırya, Andriya, Andiria, Andreanton
Başköy Sınamataş
Çırakman Çirabhan
Kutlukent Ökse, Oksi
Ovabaşı Güdedi, Güdeli
Terme Tirme, Thermi, Termeh, Thèrmae, Thermai, Thermodôn, Themiscyra, Themiskyra, Thymiskyra, Termizun, Limani
Vezirköprü Köprü, Gedegra, Kedagra, Gadegara, Kedağra, Gedeğre, Gedegre, Phazemon, Fezimon, Phazemotis, Phazamonitis, Neapolitis, Neapolis, Pompeius Neapolis, Neoklaudioupolis, Neoclaudiopolis, Nea Klaudiopolis, Teakliodiopolis, Andrapa, Nerik
Yakakent Gümenüz, Gümenez, Gümenos, Kominos
Asmapınar Congura, Congara

Siirt Province
Baykan Havil, Havil Hanları, Havel, Hana Havel
Dilektepe Minar
Eruh Dih, Dihe, Dıhe
Ballıkavak Lodi, Lodê
Kurtalan Misriç, Mısriç, Mesric, Misirc, Mısırce
Aydemir Hüseyni, Huseyni
Beşpınar Alenz
Ekinli Cefan, Ceffan
Garzan Yanarsu, Zok, Erzen, Herzan
Kayabağlar Zokayt, Zokeyf
Saipbeyli Beybo
Tatlı Gozik
Pervari Bervade, Bervari, Hançer, Hesher, Hisher
Ekindüzü Hertevin, Hartavin, Hertvin, Hertvinler, Hertevinler, Hertivinler, Hartevin, Hartiv, Hertevina, Hertivin, Artvan, Ardvan, Ardvinan, Artuvin, Artevna, Ertevın, Artoun, Ertun, Arton
Siirt Asagarta, Ziqirtu, Zikirtu, Zikirtiya, Asagrta, Siʿird, Sġerd, Sğert, Sert, Saird, Sirte, Keert, Esard, Sirt, Sgerd, Sairt
Yerlibahçe Kutmis, Kıtmıs, Kotmis
Şirvan Şervan, Kefre, Küfre, Şiran
Dişlinar Zivzik
Ormanbağı İskanbo
Özpınar Hasras
Tillo Aydınlar

Sinop Province
Ayancık İstefan, İstafan, İstifan, Stepháne
Çaylıoğlu İstefan, İstafan, İstifan, Stepháne
Boyabat Germanikopolis, Boy-Abad, Boyovası
Dikmen Kırçal, Yenicuma
Durağan Durak Han, Dura Han
Erfelek Salavat, Cumayanı, Karasu
Gerze Károusa, Karousía, Carusa, Caruse, Polichnion, Zagora, Gürzühatun, Savetova, Argibete, Gezonolit
Güzelyurt Kayser, Kaysar, Gaysel
Yenikent Gürsüfet, Gürzüfet, Gürzüfeth, Gursefet, Kousafet
Saraydüzü Kızıloğlan
Sinop Sinope, Sinopi, Sinopa, Sinuwa, Sinova, Sinavur, Sinopolli, Sinopion, Sinub, Sinob
Akliman Almiros Liman, Armene, Harmène
Nisiköy Karakum
Türkeli Yarna, Gemiyanı, Ayandon, Aya Andon, Ágios Antónios, Áyios Antónios
Gökçealan Ciple, Cible
Güzelkent Colussa, Colossa, Koloussa, Helaldı, Ayvasil, Áyios Vasílios
Hamamlı Ayandon, Aya Andon, Ágios Antónios

Sivas Province
Akıncılar Ezbider
Altınyayla Tonus, Tonosa
Başören Başviran, Başveren
Kuşaklı Sarissa, Sariza, Σάριζα
Divriği Divrik, Abrik, Tephrike, Tefrike, Τεφρική, Tewrik, Apbrike
Adatepe Pingen, Pingan, Marabat, Rabat, Binkyan, Pinkyan, Pingian, Benekyan, Benkan, Penga, Binga, Pinguyan
Beyköy Sevir
Çayözü Hamo, Örenik
Çiğdemli Tuğut, Toğut, Tığud, Ağılcık
Duruköy Arege, Türkarege, Türk Arege, Araga, Narega, Narek, Nareg, Aregaküğ
Uluçayır Vazıldan
Doğanşar İpsile
Gemerek Gamirk, Garmrak, Kemer-i Ak, Gamaraha, Euagina
Gölova Ağvanis, Ağvanıs, Ahvanis, Akvanis, Ağuants
Gürün Tilgarimo, Tilgarimmu, Tegaramma, Tilgarimmu, Toharamma, Gaurênê
Göbekören Göbekviran, Göbekveran
Konakpınar Konakboğaz, Konukboğan
Hafik Koçhisar, Bedrosi, Havik
Çukurbelen Hanzar
Dışkapı Kemis, Gemis, Kamis, Gamis, Kámisa, Kembis
Ekingölü Ohturum, Ohtum
Göydün Govdun
İmranlı Çit, Hamitabad, Hamidabad, Ümraniye
Karacaören Karacaviran 
Kangal  Aranga, Arangas, Kángara, Euspena
Alacahan Aranda
Çetinkaya Aşudu
Koyulhisar Mişaz, Nicopolis, Nikopolis, Koyluhisar, Koyunlu Hisar, Köylühisar, Kolhisar, Koyisar, Colonia, Kolonya
Sivas Sebastia, Sebasteia, Sebastian, Sebaste, Sebastea, Sevasteia, Sevasteias
Sivritepe Mamuga
Kabasakal: Karnalis, Comaralis
Suşehri Endires, Enderes, Andreas, Antrias, Aşkharova, Aşkharhaberd, Andıryas, Akşehir, Akşerabad, Suşar
Akşar Akşarova, Akşarabat, Akşehirabad
Çataloluk Sis
Yeşilyayla Nikópolis, Purk, Pürk, Purk, Burg, Bürg, Purkh
Şarkışla Şehirkışla, Şarkiye, Magalasso, Tonus, Tenos, Malandara, Marandara
Gümüştepe Yapaltın, Yapıaltın
Yıldızeli Yenihan, Norhan, Bathys Ryax, Bathyryax, Βαθυρύαξ
Zara Koçgiri
Şerefiye Eves, Abeş, Habeş

Şanlıurfa Province
Şanlıurfa Province Urfa
Akçakale Tel Abyad, Tal Abyad, Tel Ebyaz, Kaniya Hezalan, Gire Spi, Tel Ebyad, Tell Abyad
Birecik Birtha, Al-Birah, Bile, Bir, Bithra, Macedonopolis, Makedonoupolis, Birsa, Makedonopolis, El-Bire
Bozova Bozabad, Hevenç, Hevag, Heveng
Ceylanpınar Resülayn, Resulayn, Ras ul-Ayn, Sere Kani, Serekani, Ra's al 'Ayn, Sere Kaniye, Serekaniye, Vaşşugar, Sere Kani
Halfeti Rumkale, Shitamrat, Şitamrat, Urima, Orima, Qal'a Rhomayta, Kal'a Rhomeyta, Hesna d-Romaye, Romaion Koula, Qal'at al-Rum, Qal'at al-Muslimin, Urumgala, Ρωμαίων Κούλα
Fıstıközü Tişe, Tisa, Tis'a
Harran Haran, Charrae, Harranu, Carrhae, Karrai, Karrae, Hellenopolis, Ellinopolis, Haraan, Harrana, Harana
Hilvan Karacürün, Cunre Reş, Curnereş
Siverek Sevreg, Sevaverak, Sevaverek, Suk, Severeg, Sevaverag, İşmerika, İsmerika
Suruç Pirsus, Serugh, Seruğ, Sıruğ, Saruj, Sarug, Siruç, Batnan, Batnae, Batnai, Batna, Tell-Batnan, Anthemuzia, Batnea, Matf Suhunh, Seruç, Tepartip
Şanlıurfa Urfa, Al-Ruha, Riha, Rıha, Ruha, Rüha, Ruhai, Ar-Ruha, Ruhha, Reha, Urhoy, Edessa, Urha, Urraha, Urhai, Urhei, Orrha, Orrhoa, Callirrhoe, Antiochia on the Callirhoe, Antiocheia epi Kallirrois, Justinopolis, Yedesia, Adma, Adme, Admi, Admum, Callirrhoe, Ourha, Orhay, Orhayi, Orhai, Orhei, Osrhoene, Osroene, Rohais, Ur Kaśdim, Ur
Eyyübiye
Haliliye
Karaköprü
Viranşehir Veranşar, Constantina, Constantia, Konstantine, Konstantina, Tella, Tela, Tila, Tel Muzlath, Tell Mewzîn, Antiochia in Mesopotamia, Antiochia in Arabia, Antiochia Arabis, Antiocheia tin Arabiki, Antiocheia tis Mesopotamias, Antoninopolis, Maximianopolis, Antoniopolis
Sayarlı Et-Tu'aim

Şırnak Province
Beytüşşebap Elke, Elki, Beth Şabath
Cizre Kumaha, Gazarta, Bazibda, Bezabde, Beth Zabdai, Ceziretüşşeref, Cezire-i İbn Ömer, Ceziret İbn-Ömer, Cezire, Kardu Gazarta, Cizir, Cizira Botan, Ceziretuşşeref, Gzirto, Gzarto d'Beth Zabdai, Zabdaion Xorion
Güçlükonak Base, Basan, Basa, Basanferho, Basana Ferho, Basan Ferḧo, Haraniferho, Haraneferho
Fındık Pervane, Parona, Perevane
İdil Hazak, Hezeh, Hezek, Hezex, Hzeq, Azak, Azekh, Azah, Asihu, Azkheniye, Azkhoye, Bet Zabday, Beth Zabday, Bazebdey, Bethzabday, Ba-Zebde
Haberli Bsorino, Basibrin, Basibirin, Beth Sbirino, Bar Sabirin
Kayalı Kefşin, Kefshenne, Kefo Dshaino, Kef Sheno, Kafshenne, Kıfshenne
Kayı Hedel, Hetel, Hetil, Hedil, Hedyle, Hidil, Hedile
Yarbaşı Esfes, Hespist, Hestpist, Esphis
Silopi Silopiya, Gırige Amo, Girik Amo
Şırnak Şehr-i Nuh, Nuh, Sirunak, Sareisa, Şarişa, Şereşa, Şerişa, Shareisha, Shereshe, Σάρεισά
Kumçatı Dergul
Uludere Kılaban, Kilaban, Guyan
Andaç Alamon, Geramon, Halmon
Ortaköy Aruş, Aroş, Aroş Tahtayta
Ortasu Roboski, Robozke, Robozik, Robizik, Robozge, Rubozge, Rubizik
Uzungeçit Derhin, Deraheni, Derahine

Tekirdağ Province
Çerkezköy Türbedere
Çorlu Tzirallum, Tzirallun, Tzirallon, Tzouroulos, Tzouroullon, Syrallo, Sirello, Zorolus, Tzarylus, Tzurulum, Tzurulus, Tzurule, Tschurla, Tziraltum, Tributon, Tyroloe, Tyroloi
Hayrabolu Chariòpolis, Chariupolis, Hanri-polis, Hayrı-bol
Malkara Malgar, Malgara, Margaar, Margar, Miğal-kara, Megalora, Megallıora, Melagoro
Kermeyan Kerman, Kermen, Apri, Zesutare, Aprus, Apros, Ἄπρος, Aproi, Ἄπροι, Κερμέν 
Marmara Ereğlisi Marmara Ereğli, Perinthos, Perinthus, Heraclea, Heraklia
Muratlı Murateli, Murad İli, Zeli, Ζέλη
Arzulu Agorgianni, Αγώργιαννη, Arzılı, Erzeli
Aşağısevindikli Kato Vendiki, Κάτω Βενδική
Aydınköy Hocaaydın Çiftliği, Aidinion, Aidini, Αϊδίνιον, Αϊδίνι 
Ballıhoca Apella, Απέλλα
Çevrimkaya Kapsa, Κάψα
Hanoğlu Chonion, Honion, Χωνίον
İnanlı Avli, Αυλή
Kepenekli Küçük Kepenekli, Katakleis, Κατακλείς
Kırkkepenekli Kirkos, Κίρκος, Kirk-Kiopekli, Κιρκ-Κιοπεκλή
Müsellim Messida, Μεσσίδα
Yavaşça Siganon, Σιγανόν
Yeşilsırt Aşağısırt, Kato Syrte, Κάτω Συρτή
Yukarısevindikli Ano Vendiki, Άνω Βενδική
Yukarısırt Ano Syrte, Άνω Συρτή
Yurtbekler Tatar Bacdar, Tara, Τάρα
Mürefte Myriophyton, Myriophytum, Miriofido, Myriophytos
Saray Anaktoro, Ανάκτορο
Büyükyoncalı Büyükmanika, Büyükmarika, Manika, Tatarköy
Edirköy Edri
Kastro Çamlıköy
Kavacık Léfki
Küçükyoncalı Küçükmanika, Küçükmarika, Kocatarla, Demirbaş
Yuvalı Kalimérion
Şarköy Peristasi, Peristatis, Peristasis, Şehirköy, Tristatis, Agorà
Eriklice Herakleítsa, Ereğlice
Gaziköy Ganos, Ganoz, Işıklar
Güzelköy Melen, Melion, Milan
Hoşköy Hora
Yeniköy Neohori, Neoxori
Uçmakdere Avdimo
Tekirdağ Rodosçuk, Tekfurdağ, Bisanthe, Bisanthi, Rodosto, Rhaedestus, Resisto, Resisthon, Raidestos
Süleymanpaşa
Barbaros Byzanthe, Bisante, Panion, Banados, Byzanthe-Panion
Karaevlialtı Heraion Teikhos
Kumbağ Kumbos, Hrysabelos, Koumbao

Tokat Province
Tokat Province Komana, Komano, Kah-Cun, Dâr'ün-Nusret, Dâr'ün-Nasr, Sobaru
Almus Tozanlı
Artova Arıkova, Kızılca
Başçiftlik Beşçiftlik
Erbaa Phanaroia, Phanaroea, Opotorma, Herek, Erek
Bağpınar Emeri, Emeria
Çeşmeli Tazı, Tazou
İverönü Ibora, Viranönü
Kale Evpatorya, Eupatoria, Magnopolis
Karayaka Alinek, Zidi, Ziydi
Niksar Cabira, Kabeira, Diospolis, Sebaste, Neokaisareia, Neocaesarea, Neo Kaisaria
Çatak Çamiçi
Dönekse Boğazbaşı
Gökçeli Kılavuzlu, Ladik, Ladikcik, Ladincik
Ballıca Mah. Heraa
Gözpınar Mah. Boğama, Bugama
Yakınca Mah. Bideze 
Günebakan Alahtiyan
Pazar Cellarion, Kazabad, Kazova, Ayna Pazarı, Aynalı Pazar, Eyinepazarı, Eğrişehir, Avnibey Pazarı, Ayan Pazarı
Reşadiye İskefser, İskefsur, İskefsir
Sulusaray Çiftlik, Sebastopolis, Heracleopolis
Tokat Komana, Komano, Eudokia, Toh-kat, Dahyu, Dokeia, Evdokia, Evtokiya, Evtokia, Evdoksia, Dokia, Dokat, Tokati
Akbelen Bizeri, Bidzari
Aktepe Bolos, Bolis, Bolus, Baulus, Berissa, Berisa, Verisa, Verissa
Bağbaşı İbibse
Kılıçlı Gümenek, Kumanat, Pontos Komana, Komana Pontika, Komana, Pontik Komana, Komona Pontik, Comana Pontica
Yağmurlu Ohtap, Ohtab, Oğdap
Turhal Gazioura, Kasiura, Talaura, Gaziura, Turnalit, Τάλαυρα
Akçatarla Dazmana, Dazman, Dazimon, Anzen, Δαζιμῶν
Yeşilyurt Arabacımusa, Arabacı Musa, Musaköy
Zile Zela, Zila, Zelitis, Zelid, Anzila, Gırgırıye, Karkariye, Zīleh, Zilleli, Zeyli, Silas, Silla

Trabzon Province
Akçaabat Polathane, Platana, Plàtanos, Platanus, Pulatane, Pulathane, Akçeabad
Akçakale Kordil, Gördil, Skordíli, Kordyla, Kordylê, Cordyle
Araklı Erakleia, Arakale, Heraklia, Karadere
Arsin Arsini, Arsínê, Arseni Zîr
Beşikdüzü Liviopolis, Livopoli, Popoli, Yavebolu, Yavıbolu, Yobol, Şarlı, Şarli, Nefsi Şarlı, Nefs-i Şarlı, Akhisar
Çarşıbaşı İskefiye, İskefye, Cavdandoz, Çavdaniyoz
Çaykara Kadahor, Kato Horiou, Katohoriou, Kato Choriou, Katokhor, Katohori
Akdoğan Yukarı Hopşera, Khopsera
Arpaözü İpsil
Ataköy Şinek
Baltacılı/Yeşilalan Xolaisa
Çambaşı Anaşo, Anatho
Çamlıbel Harheş
Çayıroba Yente
Demirkapı Haldizen, Xaldizen
Demirli Kotli
Derindere Aso Foliza
Eğridere Ğorğoras
Fındıklıdere Lemetos
Işıklı Huşo
Kabataş Fotinos, Fatinos, Phótinos, Photino, Kestanelik
Karaçam Heneke
Kayran Limli
Koldere Vahtanç
Köknar Ogene, Okena, Ocena
Köşeli Klisura
Kumlu Mimilos
Maraşlı Paçan, Patsan
Soğanlı Aşağı Hopşera, Khopsera
Şahinkaya Şur, Şiro
Şekersu Sakarsu
Taşkıran Çoroş
Taşlıgedik Mezrai Paçan, Mezire-i Patsan
Taşören Zeleka
Uzungöl Saraho, Şaraho, Sarahos
Uzuntarla Alisinos, Alithinos
Dernekpazarı Kondu, Kondualtı, Kontou, Kondi
Akköse Zeno, Seno
Çalışanlar Kalanas
Çayırbaşı Fotregan
Gülen Visir, Vizir, Wisir
Günebakan Zenozena
Ormancık Makdanos
Taşçılar Fotkene
Tüfekçi Arşela, Arsela
Yenice Marladas, Mardadas
Zincirlitaş Vecceno, Promut, Viccino, Vezeno, Wezeno
Düzköy Haçka
Köprübaşı Güneşara, Ruzar
Maçka Matsouka, Matsuka, Maçxa
Akarsu Laraxanes, Larahanis, Larxan, Larhan
Atasu Galyan, Kalíana, Galiana, Şahinkaya
Hamsiköy Hamseköy, Tsiacharanton, Tsaxaranton, Hapsi,  Hapse, Hapsín, Hapsía
Konaklar Galyan Mesohor, Galiana Mesohor
Şimşirli Kostoulantôn, Kuştul
Of Ophious, Opinute, Oput'e, Ophis, Op, Ophiusa, Ophiussa, Ofis, Ofi, Ophius, Opi-Satrapela
Ağaçbaşı Kazret
Ağaçseven Samri, Azmiye
Aşağıkışlacık Aşağı Xastikoz
Barış Komarit
Başköy Pasxal, Pashal
Bayırca Kono Yazıcı
Birlik Komarita
Bölümlü/Çataldere Zisino, Sissino
Ballıca Melinoz
Cumapazarı Küçük Xol, Küçük Hol, Khol
Çaltılı Zixali
Çatalsöğüt Nefsi Kırinta, Krenita, Krinita
Dağalan Kırinta Makidanoz, Krinita Makidanoz
Darılı Savan
Doğançay Dirgona
Dumlusu Kırinta Mavrand, Krinita Mawran
Erenköy Çoruk, Tsorouk, Tsorusch
Gökçeoba Kavalar
Güreşen Varelit 
Gürfındık Yukarı Mavrand
Gürpınar Mapsino
İkidere Xazerkozan
Karabudak Aşağı Muzkar
Kavakpınar Yaranoz
Kazançlı Maxtandoz, Mahdandoz
Kıyıboyu Kolenli
Kiraz İşkenaz, Skena
Kireçli Xarvel, Harvel
Korkut Tervel, Korkotas
Korucuk Malpet
Kumludere Komanit
Meyvalı Bolalis, Pulalis, Pulelas
Ovacık Xaksa
Örtülü Lazandos
Pınaraltı Vuydak
Saraçlı Xalman
Sarıkaya Sunis
Serince Zariyoz
Sıraağaç Çalek, Calik
Sivrice Kuriç
Söğütlü Xalt, Khald, Sapanca
Sugeldi Zevait
Tavşanlı Miço
Tekoba Zebeşke
Uluağaç İştoloz, Stylos
Yanıktaş Yaranoz
Yazlık İvyan
Yemişalan İstavri, Stavri
Yukarıkışlacık Yukarı Xastikoz
Sürmene Sourmena, Sürmena, Susurmene, Hyssus, Hyssos, Issiporto, Hamurgan, Susarmia, Augustopolis
Şalpazarı Ağasar, Akhisar, Şar Pazarı
Tonya Thoania, Tonias, Tongias, Tongia
Karaağaçlı Aspuryanlı, Asprogiale, Asprogiali
Trabzon Trebizond, Trapezund, Tribisonde, Trapezus, Trapezous, Trapezon, Trapezounda, Trapezounta, Tara Bozan, T'amt'ra, T'rap'uzani, T'rap'izoni, Trapizon, Trapizoni, Hurşidabat, Ozinis, Trapezunt, Trapezunta, Trebisonda, Tirapezun, Tarabefzun
Ortahisar
Pelitli Hos Palavrak, Xos Palavrak, Xótsa-Parauláki, Hótsa-Parauláki, Xótsa, Xotse, Hotsi, Hotsis, Hotzi, Kymina, Kimina, Kymini, Kimini
Vakfıkebir Büyükliman, Fol, Vakfıhatuniye, Dzveli Kerasuni
Yomra Durana, Gemoura, Dirona

Tunceli Province
Tunceli Province Dersim, Daranalis, Daranis, Derksene
Çemişgezek Çmşkacag, Melkişi, Cemşid Kenzek, Çımışkadsag, Herapolis, Çemişkezek
Akçapınar Vaskovan, Vaskuvan, Vasılgavan, Vasakavan
Gedikler Germili, Kermili, Kermil, Garmri
Hozat Chozanon, Chozat
Bayram Hadişar
Çağlarca Peyik, P'eyig
Kalecik Seğedik, Segedik, Sigédig
Karaçavuş Zankireg, Zanekrek, Zankirag, Zankırage, Zankirege, Sekerik
Mazgirt Mezgir, Mazgerd, Mazgird, Mazkerd, Mezingirt, Medzgerd, Metskert, Medskert, Mendskert
Akpazar Çarsancak, Peri, Perri, Per, Çarsenceq, Çorsantsk
Darıkent Mohindi, Muhundu, Muxundu, Moxindi, Moxındi, Muxundi
Nazımiye Kızıl Kilise, Qisle, Nazmiye, Kızılkilise, Kısle
Büyükyurt Hakis, Havkis
Dallıbahçe İresik, İrisik, Eresk, Yeresk
Ramazanköy Remedan
Ovacık Pulur, Pilur, Plur, Vacuğe
Arslandoğmuş Cerpazin, Çirpazin, Çrpajini, Fereto
Elgazi Balıka, Balkan, Elgaziye, Elqaji
Eskigedik Birman, Biriman, Birimuşağı, Kalan
Havuzlu Hopik, Hopig, Hopıke
Karaoğlan Balikan, Balıkuşağı, Balikuşağı, Karaağılan
Yakatarla Zaruk, Dar'ug
Yeşilyazı Zeranik, Zeranige, Zeranıge, Zeranîg, Zereng, Dziranig, Havaçor, Havaçur
Pertek Pertag, Pertage, Pertaq, Partage, Pertak, Berdak
Akdemir Şıvak, Şevak, Şavak, Şevaq, Etker, Avşeker, Avseker, Avşker, Avaşeker
Ayazpınar Titinik, Titenik
Çalıözü Vasgert, Vasgirt, Vasgerd, Vaskerd, Vasgagerd
Pülümür Kuzucan, Kuzuçan, Kuzudjan, Kuzujan, Koziçan, Kurujan, Kızuçan, Pilemor, Pilemuriye, Pilumi, Pilomi, Pılemoriye, Pulemuriye, Plurmorri, Pule Muriye, Bolomor
Dağyolu Şeteri, Seteri, Seteriye, Şater
Dereboyu Danzik, Dantsig, Tandzik, Thanjige, Thonjige
Tunceli Kalan, Mamekiye, Mamiki, Mamikon, Mameki, Mamiki, Qalan
Aktuluk Türüşmek, Trüşmeg, Troşmag, Troşmek
Alacık Ruşnek, Röşnek, Roşnek, Rosnage, Roşnage, Haydaran, Taği, That
Doluküp Merho, Merhu, Merxo, Merxu
Geyiksuyu Sin
Kocakoç Pah, Pax
Tüllük Kâhmut, Kahmud, Kaxmut, Gağnud, Tülik, Sütlü

Uşak Province
Banaz Panásion
Ahat Ahad, Akmonya, Acmonia, Akmonia, Akmonea, Ἀκμονία
Alaba Alabağ
Ayrancı Comburt
Ayvacık İmras, İmrez, İmraz, Emrez, Emir Aziz, Emir Azizlü, Emir Azizli
Bağkonak Gümle, Gümele, Gümüle
Çamsu Çece
Güllüçam Erciş, Erceş
İslamköy Alia
Muratlı Samra, Samara
Reşadiye Hamidiye
Yazıtepe Dolay
Yeşilyurt Falos, Folos, Folus
Eşme Elvanlar
Armutlu Ürküden
Çaykışla Davala
Güllübağ Çakal, Çakallar
Günyaka Sirge Hamitli, Sirke, Sirge
Oymalı Zaptiyeli, Keşişli
Uluyayla Haliviran
Karahallı Pepuza, Pepouza, Kara Halil
Sivaslı Sebaste, Sivaslu
Ağaçbeyli Kureyş, Kureş
Eldeniz İldeniz
Payamalan Eibéos, Sebástê
Ulubey Ulu-Göbek, Ulugöbek, Göbek, Blaundus, Blaundos
Avgan Afgan
Çalışkanlar Emekse
Çamlıbel Katırcık
Küçükilyaslı Ellez, Küçük Ellez, Küçük İlyaslı, Kötüilyaslı, Kötüköy
Külçen Gılcan
İnay Naïs, Mais
Sülümenli Balándos, Blaudos, Blaundos, Blaundus, Süleymanlı
Uşak Uşşak, Temenothytia, Temenouthyrai, Timenou Thirai, Flaviopolis, Temenos Thyra, Τημένου θύραι, Efkarpia, Eukarpia, Ευκαρπία, Ousakeion, Opsikion, Obsekion, Obsikion, Ουσάκειον, Ουσάκ
Akbulak Hopuş
Alanyurt Sirke, Sirge
Altıntaş Leşler
Bozköy Zeb, Zibe, Zib, Zep
Bozkuş Bozguş
Çamyazı Hamidli Tekesıyan
Çamyuva Munkarıb, Bin Garip, Mınkırab, Mınğırap, Munga Arap
Çevreköy Akse, Akkilise
Demirören Marlık
Gökçedal Nadra, Nadara
Gökçetepe Hüsam
Güneli Mıdıklı
Güre Bagis
Kaşbelen Mende, Minde
Mesudiye Kafirviran
Ortaköy Gâvurören, Traianópolis
Örencik Eşmedenbağ
Şükraniye Tymion, Kalınkilise, Galinse, Kalınisa
Taşkonak Sirgetaş
Yoncalı Teğen, Teyen, Tegen, Tegene

Van Province
Bahçesaray Müküs, Müks, Mokk, Moks, Mugs, Mogs, Miks, Moksene, Moksenne, Moghk, Mogkh, Moksk, Moksus, Moksos, Mukus, Mikus, Mekes, Muksi, Muski
Başkale Adamakert, Adamma, Albak, Ağbak, Ağpag, Aghpag, Aluaka, Elbak, Kotur-Elbak, Serağbak, Hatamagerd, Atamagerd, Hadamagerd
Albayrak Şikefti, Şekeffi, Zapbaşı, Dér
Yanal Soradér, Soradir, Tsoradér
Çaldıran Abağa, Apağa, Ebeh, Bazidaha, Bayizaha, Bayezidağa
Çatak Şah, Şatah, Şatak, Şatakh, Şitak, Şıtak, Shadakh, Shatakh, Tağ, Tağı Hakkari
Edremit Artamet, Ardamad, Ertemetan, Artemetan, Erdmed, Aretmet, Erdemed, Ardmad, Ardamed, Erdmad, Erdemid, Sarmansuyu, Gümüşdere
Dilkaya Xorkom, Khorgom, Khorkom
Erciş Akants, Artchesh, Erdiş, Artiş, Arzes, Arzaşkun, Arsissa, Argişti Khinili, Arciş, Ardişi, Eganis, Arçeş, Ardjesh, Ardjish, Arzastu, Arsaşku, Arsesa, Arceş, Agants
Ulupamir Altındere, Pırnaşin, Prnaşén
Gevaş Vostan, Westan, Vastan, Vestan, Vustan, Vosdan, Gevash, Rshdunik
Daldere Karkar, Gargar, Kakar
Göründü Mıhrabet, Mihrabet, Mihrapet, Mohrapert, Mehrabed, Merhapet, Garmravank
Yemişlik Narik, Narek
Gürpınar Payizava, Havesor, Havasor, Hayots-tzor, Hayots Dzor, Hayots Tsor, Hevasor, Have-tzor, Hava Sor
Çavuştepe Aspeşin, Asbaşén, Aspaşin, Asdvadzaşen, Haikaşen, Haykaberd, Sardurihinilli
Güzelsu Hoşap, Hoşab, Hoşap Castle, Khoshap, Mamüretül Hamid, Mamuretülhamid, Mamüret-ül Hamid, Mamurat’ul-Hamid
Topyıldız Norduz, Mervane, Norapert, Noradiz, Antsevatsik, Mamuratul-Reshad, Mamüretül Reşat
Muradiye Berkri, Begiri, Bargiri, Bergiri, Bargeri, Pergri
Ünseli Ernis, Ar'nisd
Özalp Kargalı, Kerkeli, Karkeli
Boyaldı Perâkal, Pirkal
Dorutay Taşrumi
Saray Mahmudiye, Mehmudi, Mahmudi, Sere, Kâzımpaşa
Kapıköy Heretil
Keçikayası Kavlik
Turanköy Panamerik 
Van Tuşpa, Tuşba, Biaina, Tosp, Tospa, Thospitis, Θωσπῖτις, Tushpa, Iban, Eva, Εύα
İpekyolu
Erçek Arcişag
Tuşba
Çitören Harabe, Pert-Norküğ
Gedikbulak Canik, Timar

Yalova Province
Yalova Province Pylopythia, Xenodochion
Altınova
Hersek Kibotos, Drepanon, Drepana, Helenopolis, Helenapolis, Eleinou Polis
Armutlu Armoda, Armodo, Armodies, Enrutluk, Emrudili, İmrudili, Armoutlion, Kallipolis
Çınarcık Kio
Esenköy Katırlı
Termal Pythia Therma, Pythia, Pythion, Therma, Pythia Thermai
Yalova Yalıova, Pylae, Pylai, Plai, Yalakabad, Yalakova, Yalak Âbad, Halizones, Elenopolis

Yozgat Province
Akdağmadeni Argyríōn, Ἀργυρίων, Maden
Muşalikalesi Agranai, Charsianon Kastron, Charsianon, Qal'e-i Ḥarsanōs, Χαρσιανόν, Χαρσιανόν κάστρον
Aydıncık Eskiköy, Mamure
Çekerek Hacıköy
Kadışehri Devecidağı
Saraykent Karamağara, Siboron, Σίβορον
Sarıkaya Opel, Terzili, Terzilihamam, Terzili Hamamı, Hamam
Sorgun Sorkun, Sorhun
Pteria Piterya, Kerkenes, Πτερία 
Şefaatli Hacişefaatli, Haji Chefan
Yenifakılı Fakılı, Karafakihli
Yiğitler Sorsavuş
Yozgat Bozok, Piteryum, Pteria, Giosgati, Jusgat, Youzgath, Yuzgat, Yozgad, Γκιοζγκάτ
Büyüknefes Tavia, Tavium, Taouion, Nefezköy, Τάβια

Zonguldak Province
Alaplı Samako, Kali, Kale, Kales, Keles, Cales, Alpali
Gümeli Gömülü
Çaycuma Çay Cami
Filyos Hisarönü, Tium, Teium, Tieium, Tius, Teion, Tieion, Tion, Tios, Teios
Nebioğlu Karaevli
Saltukova Saltukeli, Arz'ı Saltuk
Devrek Hamidiye, Hızırbey
Gökçebey Tefen
Karadeniz Ereğli Pontoirachleia, Pontoirakleia, Heraclea Pontica, Benderekli, Bend Ereğli, Heraklea, Bender Ereğli, Bender-i Ereğli, Erekli, Ergeli, Ereyli
Zonguldak Zonegöldağ, Zonegöldag, Sandraka, Sandràke, Zongoldak
Çatalağzı Psylla

Geographical Locations

Gulfs, Bays, Coves, Inlets
ANZAC Cove Anzak Koyu
Asin Cove Mikra Thalassa
Bulgaz Bay Bulgaz Koyu, Thymnias
Gulf of Alexandretta İskenderun Körfezi, Issus, Mare Issicum, Issicus Sinus, Ermeni Körfezi, Myriandrus, İsos
Gulf of Antalya Sattalia
Gulf of Çandarlı Çandarlı Körfezi, Elaytik, Elaitikos, Elaitic, Cumaeus, Elaeus, Elaitikos Sinus, Ὲλαϊτικὸς κόλπος
Gulf of Fethiye Makri Körfezi, Thermessos, Meğri, Macre, Mekri, Telmessos, Glaucus Sinus, Glafkos, Glaukos Sinus, Glaukos Sinos, Glaukos Kolpos, Golfe de la Macra en Caramanie, Katrancı Körfezi, Telmissus, Κόλπο της Τελμησσού, Γλαύκος, Κόλπου της Μάκρης, Κόλπος της Μάκρης, Κόλπος του Γλαύκου
Gulf of Gemlik Cius
Gulf of Gökova Kerme Körfezi, Gereme Körfezi, Keramikos, İstanköy Körfezi, Kerameikos, Ceramic Gulf, Gulf of Kos, Golfo di Stanchio, Golfe di Stanchio, Κεραμεικός κόλπος, Kerameikos Kolpos
Gulf of Güllük Mandalya Körfezi, Golfe de Mandaya, Mendelia, Bargyliakos Kolpos, Bargyleticus Sinus, Iasikos Kolpos, Mendelya, Iassicus Sinus, Gulf of Iasos
Gulf of Hisarönü Sömbeki Körfezi, Gulf of Symi, Bubassius Sinus
Gulf of İzmir Smyrna, Ermaikos, Ermaicos, Hermaicos, Hermaikos, Hermaeus, Smyrnaeus, Hermeios Sinus, Meletos, Smyrnaeus Sinus
Gulf of Izmit İstakoz Körfezi, Astakus, Nikomedya, Istakos, Astakinos, Astakenos
Gulf of Kuşadası Efes Körfezi, Kolpos Efesou, Korfos tis Skalanovas, Kafstrios, Kaystros, Κόλπος Εφέσου
Gulf of Saros Melas, Saroz, Megariz, Kolpos Ksyrou
Haliç Altın Boynuz, Golden Horn, Chrysókeras, Sinus Ceratinus, Keratios Kolpos, Chryson Keras
Hamsilos Bay Hamsalos, Hamsoros
Marmaris Bay Fisko Körfezi
Morto Bay Morto Koyu, Sığırini, Morta
Selimye Bay Losta Körfezi
Suvla Bay Suvla Koyu

Islands
Adana Islands
Karataş Islets Didimae, Didymoi
Küçük Ada Islet
Yumurtalık Island Atlas, Ayas, Kızkalesi
Antalya Islands
Alanya & Gazipaşa Islands
Alabaz Taşı Islet
Çakal Islet Dinek
Güvercinlitaş Islet Okurcalar
İncekum Islet
Kalaytaşı Islet Delikdeniz, Güneyköy
Tuz Islet Karaburun, Kara Burun, Kibyra Mikra, Cibyra, Kibyra Minor, Cibyratae, Cibyra of Pamphylia, Cyberna, Mylome Justinianus, Mylome, Κυβέρνη, Μικρά Κίβυρα
Yalçılı Islet Zeytinada, Seyfe
Beşadalar Islands Beş Adalar, Şıldanlar, Kutsal Kayalar, Gelidonya,  Şilidonya, Khelidonia, Helidonya, Kaledonya, Kırlangıç Adaları, Taşlıkburnu, Yardımcı Burnu, Chelidoniae Insulae, Chelidoniai, Celidoni, Chelidonia, Chelidonides nisoi, Îles Chélidoniennes, Shelidonian, Χελιδονίδες νῆσοι, Χελιδονίδες νήσοι, Χελιδόνιαι, Πέντε Νησιά
Ateş Island Poligon, Atış
Devecitaşı Island Melanippeia, Melanippe, Melanippion, Uzunada
Kadir Islet Şıldan Boğazı Adacığı
Meşe Island Korydela, Corudela
Suluada Island Sulada, Sulu Ada, Krambusa, Krambousa, Crambusa, Grambúsa, Granbusa, Garabusa, Cambruxa, Ixola de Cambro, Karayoza, Karaboğaz, Caretha, Dionysias, Dionysia, Dyonisias, Gironda, Κραμπούσα
Topuk Taşı Islet
Gulf of Antalya Islands
Cineviz Island Cineviz Adası, Ceneviz Adası, Karaca Yarımadası
Pırasalı Island
Sıçan Islet Reşat, Rasat, Sultan Reşat, Güvercin, Kuş, Aratia, Arnatia, Renatia, Renathia, Ranatia, Lyrnateia, Lyrnas, Lyrnessos, Lyrnante, Attelebusa, Attelebussa (Çekirge), Attelebousa, Atelebusa, Astelebussa, Ἀττελέβουσα
Tuzla Islets Tuzla Koyu Adaları, Tuzla Adaları
Üçadalar Islands Üç Islands, Three Islands, Cypriae, Cypriæ, Cyprianae, Cyprianans, Triánesia, Tria Nisia, Trianisia, Kypriai nisoi, Κύπριαι νῆσοι, Κύπριαι νήσοι
Mağara Island
Martı Island
Piknik Island
Küçük Ada Islet
Güvercin Island Gök Burun Adacığı
Kaş Islands
Çukurbağ Islands
Gürmenli Island Körmenli, Maradi, Marathi, Marathos, Marati, Vrachonisída Marádi, Marathon, Μαραθών
Küçük Gürmenli Islet
Gürmenli Islets Gürmenli Kayaları, Gürmenli Kayalıkları, Roccie Voutzaky, Roccie Vutzachi, Rocci Vutchaki, Rocci Vutzaki, Roski Vucki, Voutzaki Rocks, Vráchoi Voutsákia, Rokko Voutsaki, Ρόκκο Βουτσάκι
Güvercin Islet Longos, Longoz
Köfte Islet
Kalkan & Patara Islands
Çatal Islands Xenagori, Xenagora, Xenagorou nesoi, Xenagorae insulis, Îles Xénagoras (8 Islands), Ξεναγόρου νήσοι, Ξεναγόρας
Sıçan Island Üvendire, Uvendire, Ochendra, Ochentres
Yılan Island Yılan Ada, Volo, Volos, Dragonēsi, Xenagorae
Kaputaş Islands
Boğazcık Islet Boğacık
Heybeli Island Kato Volo, Kato Volos, Katovolo, Catovolo, Vrachonisída Vólos, Volos, Βόλος, Κάτω Βόλος, Βραχονησίδα Βόλος
Kaptanoğlu Islet Kapatanoğlu Kayalığı, Kaptanoğlu Resifi
Öksüz Island Ufakada, Ufak, Prason, Prassoudi, Prasudi, Vrachonisída Práso
Sarıbelen Island Sarı Belen, Sidek, Furnakya, Fournachia, Fournakhia
Özlen Island Patara, Arsinoe, Πάταρα, Ἀρσινόη
Kaş Archipelago Kastelorrizo Archipelago
Başak Island Busak, Küçük Dasya, Nissi-Tis-Dacia, Νησί της Δασιά, Νησί της Ντάσια, Νησί της Ντάσιας, Ντάσια, Ντάτσια
Beşadalar Islands Beş Adalar, Pentanisia, Πεντανήσια
Bayrak Island Küçük Pighi, Nissi-Tis-Pighi, Νησί της Πηγή, Νησί της Πηγής
Küçük Bayrak Islet Tsatalota, Tahatallota, Ταχαταλλότα
Çatal Islets Çatal Adaları, Çatallota, Tchatallota, Tsatallota, Tsatalota, Catulata, Ταχαταλλότα
Büyük Çatal Islet Resif, Ρεσίφ, Ρετζίφ
Küçük Çatal Islet Agricelia, Agrikella, Agrikelya, Agrilya, Agrielia, Agrioelia Rock, Αγρικέλλα, Αγριελιά
Heybeli Island Sulu Ada, Suluada, Sulu Adası, Nisida Pighi, Nisída Pigí, Pighi, Νησίδα Πηγή, Πηγή
Besmi Islet Besmi Adası, Prasoudhi, Proussecliss, Prussekli, Vrachonisída Prouseklís, βράχος Προυσεκλής
Fakdere Islet Fakdere Koyu Adası
Güvercinli Island Güvercin, Prassoudi, Prasouda, Vrachonisída Prasoúda, Βραχονησίδα Πρασούδα, Πρασσούδι
Kanyon Islet
Kovan Island Büyük Makri Ada, Büyük Makriada, Koyan, Kovak, Nisída Áno Mákri, Pano Makri, Ano Makri, Νησίδα Ανω Μακρη, Νησίδα Άνω Μάκρη, Πάνω Μάκρη
Kovanlı Island Küçük Makri Ada, Küçük Makriada, Kato Makri, Νησίδα Κατω Μακρη, Κάτω Μάκρη
Küçük Kovanlı Islet
Sarıada Island Sarı Ada, Sarıoda, Sarıod, Sarıot, Sarı Ot, Sariot, Sarot, Saryot, Vrachonisída Dasiá, Dacia, Dash, Dasi, Dasya, Dasia, Dhassia, Βραχονησίδα Δασιά
Sığtaş Islets
Kekova Island Group
Asar Inlet Islands Aperlai Islands, Aperlae, Ἄπερλαι
Çılpacık Island
İç Ada Island İçada, İç Ada, Uçada, Akıntı Adası, Alimentaria, Alimentarya, Alimeteria, Eleksi, Αλιμεντάρια, Αλέξη, Αλέξι, Αλεξέι
Körmen Island
Sıçak Peninsula Sıçak Yarımadası, Saçak, Aperlai, Aperlae, Aperlæ, Ἄπερλαι
Gökkaya Bay Islands
Aşırlı Island Asırlı, Aşırı, Ashil, Asirli, Asil, Aşil, Çiller Adası
Gökkaya Islets Gökkaya Kayalıkları
Kasırlı Islet
Kişneli Island Kışnalı, Kişnalı, Kiseli, Kisseli, Kiliseli, Kisneli, Kınalı, St Elias, Agios Ilias, Άγιος Ηλίας
Martini Islet Martini Kayalığı
Güvercin Island Sülüklü
Karakol Islands
Akvaryum Islet Aquarium
Kara Ada Island
Topak Island Toprak
Kekova Island Geyikova, Geyikli Ova, Keklikada, Caravola, Karavola, Karavolas, Kákkabe,  Kákkabos, Kakava, Keko, Kekov, Isle de Cacomo, Dolichiste, Doliche, Dolicheus, Dolichistes, Dolikhiste, Doliquista, Καράβολα, Κέκοβα, Κάκαβα, Δολίχης, Δολιχίστη, Δολίχη, Δολιχεύς, Δολιχίστης
Kisle Strait Islands
Koyun Island
Körmen Island
Mavi Yengeç Island Beymelek, Dalyan
Polemos Island Pölemos, Polemo, Sıçak Koyu Adası, Polemos Bükü Adası
Simena Islets Simena Kayalıkları, Kaleköy Kayalıkları
Üçağız Islands
Boğaz Islet
Kaptan Island
Kurşun Island
Papaz Island
Southern Kekova Islands
Bulam Islet Bulam Adası
Karaadalar Islands
Gönül Island
Karaada Island Kara Ada
Sezgin Island
Tek Ada Island Tek Adası
Aydın Islands
Didim Islands
Dalaman Island 
Dil Islands Dil Adaları, Manastır Adası
Gökada Island Kökada, Vrachonisída Agía Kyriakí
İkikat Islets İkikat Kayalar
Isabel Islet İsabel Kayası
Küçük Saplı Island Kömür Adası
Panayır Island Altınada, Altın Adası, Panagya Adası, Vrachonisída Panagía
Saplı Island Saplıada, Akbük
Yeşilada Island Tavşan, Kargio Nisi, Plaka Adası, Vrachonisída Kargionísi
Kuşadası Islands
Bayrak Island Abanoz, Baytak, Boğaz, Narthekis, Narthikís, Ναρθηκίς, Nárthix, Narthex, Nisída Ágios Nikólaos, Panagía, Vrachonisída Ágios Nikólaos, Vrakhonisís Áyios Nikólaos
Gelin Kız Island Tavşan, Kanapiçe Adası, Kanapiçe Koyu Adası, Dipburun Adası
Güvercinada Kuş Ada, Kuşadası, Kuşada
Karga Islet Telgraf Tepe Kayalığı
Sandal Island Sevigen Adası, Vrachonisída Sandáli, Σανδάλι
Su Island Nero, Neo, Özgürlük Adası, Vrachonisída Neró
Tavşan Island Çil, Çil Ada, Çilada, Çil Adası, Ayanos, Vrachonisída Theopóri, Trogilium, Trogilion, Trogylion, Τρωγίλιον, Τρωγύλιον
Yalancı Burnu Island Yalancı Tombolosu, Yılancı, Yılan Adası, Neapolis, Scala Nuova
Lake Bafa Islands
İkizce Islet İkiz Ada, İkizada
Kahvehisar Islet Kahveasarı, Kahve Asar, Kahve Asarı, Mersinet, Ionapolis, Loniapolis
Kargahisar Islet Kargıasarı, Kargaasarı, Kargı Aşarı, Kargı Asarı, Aşar, Kapıkırı, Kapkırı, Heraklia, Hayaletada
Menet Islet Kuyulu Ada, Kuş Adası
Tavşan Islet Küçük İkizce
Uyuz Islet Serçin
Balıkesir Islands
Ayvalık Islands Cunda Adaları, Yund Adaları, Ay Adaları, Moshonisya, Moskonisya, Moschonisi, Moschonisia, Hekatonisa, Hekatonesos, Hekatonnesos, Hekatonnesoi, Hekatos, Ekatonisa, Ekatonisous, Askania, Ascania, Apollonesos, Apollonnesos, Μοσχονήσια, Εκατονήσι, Εκατόνησες
Inhabited Islands
Cunda Island Alibey, Yunda, Yund, Moshonisi, Moschonisi, Moschonisos, Moskonisi, Moshinos, Nasos, Nesos, Apolloniso, Μοσχονήσι, Μοσχόνησος, Εκατονήσι, Εκατόνησο, Νάσος, Τζούντα, Αλήμπεη, Απολλόνησο
Lale Island Dolap, Soğan, Sıçan, Sıçan Süleyman, Krommydonisi, Kromidonisi, Kromydonisi, Kremydonisi, Kromido, Κρομμύδονησι, Κρομμυδονήσι, Κρεμμυδόνησο, Κρεμμύδι, Κρομμύδι, Ντουλάπι, Κρεμμυδονήσι
Altınova side
Tüzüner Island Kum Ada, Suna, İskele Adası, Kurbağa Burnu Adası, Altınova, Ayazment, Αγιασμάτι, Τουζούνερ, Τουζούνέρ
Inner Sea Islands
Kumru Island Nisopula, Nisopoula, Ayos Nikolas, Aya Nikolas, Agios Nikolaos, Vrachonisída Ágios Geórgios, Νησοπούλα, Άγιος Νικόλας, Άγιος Νικόλαος
Tavuk Island Aya Yani, Kilise, Dalyan, Taliani, St Yoannis, St Ioannis, Agiou Ioanni, Ayos Yannis Prodromos, Agios Ioannis, Ai Giannis, Prodromos, Prodromo, Vrachonisída Ágios Ioánnis, Άγιος Ιωάννης, Αϊ Γιάννης, Πρόδρομος, Πρόδρομο, Τάλιανος
North Islands
Akoğlu Island Armutçuk, Kedi, Kopano, Kópanos, Κόπανος, Κόπανο
Aslı Island Asimonisi, Asimoniso, Eleusa, Ασημόνησο, Ασημονήσι
Balık Island Büyük Karaada, Psariano, Nisída Psarianó, Daskalio, Daskali, Daskaleio, Daskaliyo, Ψαριανό, Δασκαλειό, Δασκαλιό
Çiçek Island Gümüşlü, Argistra, Argistri, Angistri, Argyronisos, Argyroniso, Nisída Argyrónisos, Αγκίστρι, Αργυρόνησο, Γκιουμουσλί, Τσιτσέκ
Gizli Island Kör Taşlar, Sklavonisi, Σκλαβονήσι
Güvercin Island Manastır, Mozaikli Manastır, Kızlar Manastırı, Aya Yorgi, St Giorgio, Ayos Yorgis, Evangelistriya, Psifi, Άγιος Γεώργιος, Άγιος Γιώργης, Άγιος Νικόλαος, Νησίδα Ψηφί
Hasır Island Sefil, Seferi, Sefiri, Zefyri, Nisída Zefýri, Misia, Haşır, Σεφέρι, Ζεφύρι, Χασίρ
İkiz Islets İkiz Kayalar, Mırmırcılar, Mırmırcalar, Mırmırca, Vráchoi Daskaleió, βράχοι Δασκαλειό
Kalemli Island Sazlı, Oker, Öker, Kalamaki, Kalamakia, Καλαμάκια, Καλαμάκι
Kırlangıç Islets Kırlangıç Kayalığı, Kırlangıç Kayalıkları, Chelidonia, Χελιδόνια, Βραχονησίδα Χελιδόνια
Kız Island Kaşık, Kuz, Ulya, Oulia, Ioulia, Nisída Ouliá, Ουλιά, Ούλια, Ιουλία
Kutu Island Küçük Karaada, Karaada, Kara Ada, Kara, Balkan, Tavşan, Kodon, Nisída Kódon, Kudho, Kuthu, Kouda, Kondu, Kontou, Kodonas, Koudouna, Κοντού, Κώδωνας, Κουδούνα
Mırmırca Islet Μουρμούρισα, Μουρμούριζα, Μουρμούριζες
Taş Island Taş Adası, Kayabaşı, Petro, Petrusi, Petrousi, Petrusa, Petrousa, Petroutzio, Πετρούσα, Πετρούσι, Πετρούτζιο
Yumurta Island Topan, Kokkinonisi, Nisída Daskaleió, Νησίδα Δασκαλειό, Κοκκινονήσι
West Islands
Büyük İlyosta Island Güneş, İlyosta, Fener, Eleos, Nisída Éleos, Oilios, Leios, Lios, Leios, Nisída Leiós, Έλεος, Λείος, Λιός
Büyük Maden Island Pirgos, Pirgoslu, Pirgo, Pyrgos, Nisída Pýrgos, Pyrgo, Maden, Pordoselene, Pordoselini, Poroselene, Poroselini, Barsu, Πύργος, Πύργο, Πορδοσελήνη, Ποροσελήνη
Çıplak Island Chalkis, Halkis, Yimno, Cimno, Gymno, Χαλκίς, Γυμνό, Γδυμνό 
Göz Island Lipsos, Leipsos, Lipso, Leipso, Raftel, Λειψός
Kara Ada Island Kamış, Kamışada, Kalınada, Akvaryum, Karaada, Kalamos, Kalamo, Nisída Kálamos, Κάλαμος
Raftel Islet 
Sefil Islet 
Küçük İlyosta Island Yumurta, Kilyosta, Eyolida, Aigialonisi, Aigia, Eleos Pulo, Nisída Daskaleió, Vrachonisída Aigialonísi, Αιγιαλονήσι, Αιγιά, Νησοπούλα
Küçük Maden Island Adiabatoz, Adiavatos, Adiavato, Nisída Adiávatos, Αδιάβατος, Αδιάβατο
Pınar Island Kılavuz, Klavuz, Mosko, Masko, Mosko Pulo, Moschopoulo, Moschopoula, Moshopoula, Moshopula, Pera Moschos, Pera Moskos, Pera Moshos, Pera Moscho, Nisída Moschópoulo, Nisída Péra Móschos, Μοσχόπουλο, Πέρα Μόσχος, Πέρα Μόσχο, Πέρα Μόσκος
Mırmırcalar Islet
Pirgos Islets Pirgos Kayalıkları, Βραχονησίδα Πύργος
Poyraz Island İncirli, Yellice, Leyah, Lia, Leia, Leiah, Licha, Liha, Leio, Leios, Lygia, Nisída Leiá, Nisída Lícha, Λεια, Λειά, Λειὰ, Λίχα, Λείος, Λειό, Λυγιὰ, Λυγιά, Αγκίστρι
Pulakya Islands Pulakia, Poulakia, Πουλάκια
Semizhoroz Shoals Semizhoroz Sığlıkları
Taşlı Island Taş Adası, Taşlı Ada, Taşlıada, Klavo, Plati, Vrachonisída Pláti, Πλάτη
Yalnız Island Yelniz, Yalonisi, Gialonisi, Aigalo, Ayiy Alo, Γιαλονήσι
Yelken Island Pelagonisi, Vrachonisída Pelagonísi, Pelago, Πελαγονήσι
Yuvarlak Island Melina, Melena, Kalamaki, Kalamopulo, Kalamo Pulo, Vrachonisída Kalamáki, Vrachonisída Kalamópoulo, Καλαμόπουλο, Καλαμάκι
Marmara Archipelago Marmara Adaları, Arap Adaları, Marmaron, Marmaros, Proconnesus, Prokonnesos, Prokennosos
Avşa Island Türkeli, Araplar, Arablar, Avşar, Afusia, Afissia, Afyssia, Afisia, Afousia, Afisya, Aphousia, Aphisia, Avésia, Ophioússa, Ophiousa, Ophiussa, Ofiousa, Ofiusa, Aosia, Aousía, Physia, Panagia, Αφησιά, Οφιούσα, Αφυσιά, Αφουσία
Ekin Kayası Island Fener, Round Rock
Martı Island
Ekinlik Island Kutali, Koútali, Coutalli, Akanthos, Acanthus, Ekenlik, Arktónēssos, Arctonnesos, Κούταλη, Άρκτόνησος, Εκινλίκ
Erdek Islands
Tavşan Island Tavşanlı, Apiganusa (Baldıran), Peganusa, Απειγανούσα
Zeytinli Island Zeytinliada, Zeytinli Ada, Zeytin, Erdek, Artake, Arteka, Kera Panagia, Kyra Panagia, Panagia, Mexaniota, Κυρά Παναγιά, Αρτάκη
Güvercintaşı Islet
İmralı Island Aigaion, Besbicus, Besbicos, Besbikos, Besbycus, Kalolimnos, Kalolimni, Calonimi, Galios, Galyos, Calonio, Colonia, Isola del Papa, Emir Ali
Kapıdağ Islands
Akçaada Island Akça, Fatih, Timsah, Fatima, Paflima
Martı Kayası Island Martı Kayalıkları, Manastır Adaları
Şeytan Islets Şeytan Kayaları, İlhanköy Kayalıkları
Koyun Island Phoibe, Phoebe, Phivi, Kuyus
Hacı Islands
Geçit Topuğu Islet
Hasır Island Bernal, Χασίρ
Soğan Island
Mamalı Island Mamalya, Mamalia, Mamali
Marmara Island Proikonesos, Prokónnêsos, Proikónnêsos, Prokonnisos, Prikonnisos, Proconnesus, Marmaron, Marmaros, Marmora, Elafonisos, Elaphónêsos, Elaphonnesos, Elafonessos, Elaphonnesus, Neuris, Marmarás, Marmarónêsos, Προκόννησος, Προικόνησος, Μάρμαρον, Μαρμαρά
Anataş Island Adataş, Adalaş, Palapetra, Paleopetra, Batizona
Eşek Islands
Eşek Islet Gadaro
Işık Island Nisi
Kayainönü Islet
Fener Island Fenerada, Fanar, Asmalı, Asmalıada, Delphakie, Delphakia, Delphacie, Polydora, Polydori
Hayırsız Island Skopelos, Scopelos, Khersizada
Küçükada Islet
Saraylar Promontory Saraylar Tombolosu, Abruz, Arkuz
Taşada Islet
Paşalimanı Island Halone, Haloni, Halónē, Halonia, Alóni, Alônê, Aulonia, Avlonya, Alonya, Aloniso, Alonisos, Alônêssos, Nea Prokennos, Porphyrione, Porfyrioni, Άλώνη, Αλώνη
Hızır Reis Island Hızırreis, At Adası
Kötürüm Island Kuturum
Kuş Island Bala, Pala, Pale
Palamut Island Παλαμίδα
Tuzla Promontory Tuzla Tombolosu, Huhla (Salyangoz), Hühla, Chouchlia, Khoukhlia, Χουχλιά
Yer Island Yerada, Year, Yer Ada, Nísos Panagía
Mola Islands Moda Adaları, Molla Adaları
Aslanlar Islet
Cem Islets Cem Kayalıkları
Fener Island Asmalı, Agios Andreas, Ayasandıras
Hâli Islands Issız, Meksa, Mexa, Halı
Sedef Island Tavşan, Agios Georgios
Zambak Islet Zambak Adacığı
Biga Islands
Büyükada Island Büyük Ada, Değirmencik, Değirmincik
Küçükada Island Küçük Ada
Yumurta Island Yumurta Ada, Yumurtaada
İstanbul Islands
Bahariye Islands Haliç Adaları, Kosmidion, Kozmidion, Kozmodion, Κοσμιδίων
Pierre Loti Island Piyer Loti Adası, Eşek Adası
Tavşan Island
Fenerbahçe Island Fenerbahçe Adası, Fenerbahçe Burnu, Fenerbahçe Tombolosu, Hera, Ieras, Bağçe-i Fener, Hieron, Hera Kayalığı, Phanaraki, Φαναράκι, Φενέρμπαχτσε
Galatasaray Islet Kuruçeşme Adası, Sarkis Bey Islet, Γαλατάσαραϊ, Κουρουτσεσμέ
Kız Kulesi Kız Adası, Leander's Tower, Maiden's Tower, Pyrgos tou Leandrou
Prens Islands Adalar, Prince Islands, Princes Islands, Prens Adaları, Prenses Adaları, Kızıl Adalar, Papaz Adaları, Keşiş Adaları, Evliya Adaları, Şeytan Adaları, Cin Adaları, İstanbul Adaları, Halkedon Adaları, Kadıköy Adaları, Pitiusa, Çamlı Adalar, Prinkepon nesoi, Prigiponisia, Pringiponnisa, Pringiponnisia, Kokkinanisia, Dimonisi, Dimonisoi, Daimononisa, Demonnesoi, Demonesoi, Demonisi, Demonnesos, Demonnesus, Demonesca, Diavolonisia, Erythronisa, Papadonisia, Les İles des Saint, îles Rousses, Papadonisia
Burgazada Island Antigoni, Burgaz, Pyrgos, Antigoneia, Antigone, Burgo, Panormum Castrum, Kastronisida, Burgazlı Ada, Boğazlı Ada, Burgas, Antigonos, Panorimis
Büyükada Island Prinkipos, Prinkipo, Prinkips, Prens, Dimonisos, Dimoniso, Pityodi, Pityousa, Karyes, Kariye, Megale
Dilek Islets Manastır Kayalıkları, Dilek Kayalıkları, Batık Manastır Kayalıkları, Bostancı Çöken Adalar, Döküntü, Höreke, Öreke, Bostancı Çakarı, Çakar, Kayıp Adalar, Batık Adalar, Vordonos, Vordonisi, Vordones, Vordoni, Bardanos, Bardonos, Bordones
Dilek Islet Büyük Vordonos, Big Vordonos
Yıldız Islet Küçük Vordonos, Small Vordonos
Heybeliada Island Halki, Heybeli, Chalkitis, Kalké
Kaşık Island Pita, Pide, Pityodi, Pityodes, Chouliara, Mesonision, Tragonision
Kınalıada Island Proti, Prota, Proté, Prota Legomenin, Akonitis, Akonai, Elaia, Elaea
Sedef Island Terebinthos, Terebinthodes, Antirovithos, Antirovythos, Antirovinthos, Anterovithos, Androvitha, Andircuithos, Sedefadası, Erevinthodi, Erebinthote, Erebinthodes, Ile de Lapins, Coniglio, Anterovitos, Tavşanlı Ada, Tavşan Adası
Tavşan Island Neandros, Balıkçı, Niandros, Niyandros, Yandros, Iatros, Yatros, Neiandro, Neandro, Tavşanlı, Fok, Arapi, Arap
Yassıada and Sivriada Islands Rhodussae Islands, Rhodusen, Rhodusae
Sivriada Island Oxia, Ohia, Oxeia, Hayırsızada, Eşek Adası, Oxya, Okseia
Yassıada Island Plati, Plateia, Plate, Platys
Tuzla Islands
Ekrembey Island Andreas, Saint Andre, Eşek, Erembey, Tuzla Tombolosu
Fener Island Hayırsız, Sıçan
İncir Island Glikeria, Glykeria, Rahmi Koç Adası, Koç Adası, Koçun Adası, Hırvatın, Deserters' Island, Deserted Island, Hagios Gikara, Γλυκερία
Korsan Islet Harmankaya
Pavli Island Mavronisi, Aydınbey Adası, Aydınbey Yarımadası, Aydınlı
Sakız Island Sakız Tombolosu 
Şemsiye Islet Akritas
İzmir Islands
Baston Islands Garip Adaları, Bademli Adaları, Kane Adaları, Acan Adaları, Ajano, Ázano, Canae, Canaea, Cane, Argennusa, Arginusa, Arginusae, Arginusai, Argennousa, Argennon, Arginousai, Arginoussai, Arginussai, Encenoz, Ἀργέννουσα, Ἄργεννον
Adatepe Islet Fame Beach Islet 
At Islet Zindancık
Garip Island Nisída Ázano
Güvercin Rocks Nikolo Kayalıkları, Vráchos Nikolós
Kalem Island Kalemli, Kalbur, Kalbur Kaya, Kalbur Kayası, Makrónisos, Makro Nisi, Makronisi, Nikolós
Kane Promontory Kane Yarımadası, Canaea, Canae, Cone, Κάνη
Killik Islet Killik Burnu Kayalığı
Çandarlı Islands Çandarlı Körfez Adaları, Elaitik Adaları, Elatikos
Bay Islands
Akkuş Island
Bozburun Islands
Bülbül Island
Tavşan Island 
Eşek Island
İkiz Islands Adelphi, Vráchoi Adélfia, Vrachonisídes Adélfia
Küçük Ada Island Hayırsız, Vrachonisída Mikrá
Pırasa Island Nisída Prásso
Tavşan Island Nisída Platý, Πλάτη
North Side
İkikardeşler Islands İkizceler, İki Kardeşler
Güvercin Island
İkikardeşler Island Eki Kardaşlar, İkikardeş, İkizkardeşler
Karaada
Mardaliç Island Kızkulesi, Kız Kulesi, Mardalik, Mardalıç, Mardoliç, Elaioussa, Elaiussa, Elaiousa Erythraion, Aghios Georghios, Nisída Ágios Geórgios, Georgios, Corc Kalesi, Corci, George, Yorgi Kalesi, Aya Yorgi, Likusa, Liqusah, Pirgoslu, Bergazlı
Küçük Mardaliç Islet Mardaliç Koyu Adacığı
South Side
Han Kocaoğlu Islands Kaptan Sado
Taşlı Islet Akburun, Metalik
Çeşme - Sığacık Islands
Demircili Island Airai, Erai, Aerae, Αϊραι
Dümbelek Islands Saplıca, Dümbüldek
Boğaz Islet
Böğürtlen Island
Çarufa Island Bozalan, Halonessos, Halonnesos, Kamilonissi, Αλόννησος
Çırakan Island Nisída Tavátes, Tava, Tavates, Çiğdem, Çirakan
Gökkokar Islet Port Vromo, Vroma, Kokar Liman Adacığı, Gök Liman Adacığı
Kapıkaya Islet Taşada
Tektaş Island Keçi Atlamaz, Doğan Taşı
Zeytineli Islet Çiğdem
Çömez Islands Paspargos Adaları
Boğaz Island Boğazada, Nisída Panagía, Panagía, Panayía, İskafida, Παναγία 
Kaleyeri Shoal Kaleyeri Sığlığı, Kale Yeri Sığlığı, Döküntütaşı, Yfaloi Kalógeroi
Süngükaya Island Paşa, Fener, Eşek, Pasparo, Paspari, Pasparigo, Davidson Kayalığı, Nisída Páspargo, Páspargos, Pasparagos, Paspariko, Πάσχαργο, Πάσπαργο, Νησίδα Πάσπαργος
Eğriliman Islands
Adsız Islets Üçadalar
Raks Islets Nisídes Rákos, Βραχονησίδα, Νησιδες Βράχος
Üçadalar Islets Karakayalar, Black Rocks, Trianisia, Τριανήσια 
Foça Islands Foça Adaları
Azaplar Islets Venedik Kayaları, Merminci, Vráchoi Mermígkia, Vrákhoi Mermíngia, Myrmikes, Myrmingia, Myrmikia, Myrminkies, Μυρμικες (Karıncalar), Μυρμίγγια, Μυρμηγκιά, Μυρμηκία, Μυρμηγκιές
Cape İngiliz İngiliz Burnu, İngiliz Adası, Sekiz Adası (Eight Island)
Eşek Islet Kalorrizitis, Καλορριζίτης
Fener Island Oğlak, Middle, Elaiousa, Partheni, Ελαιούσα, Ογλάκ, Παρθένι
Fırkata Islets Fırkata Kayalıkları
Hayırsız Island Atatürk Adası, Karteria, Χαϊρσίζ, Καρτερία
İncir Island Sağır, Sağırada, Sagir, Aya Yorgi, St George's, Hagios Georgios, Hagios Giorgios, Ágios Geórgios, Bakkheion, Bacchium, Bacchina, Bakchos, Bakatanisi, Bakchou Nesos, Vakcheion, Βακχείον, Αη Γιώργη, Άγιος Γεώργιος, Αγίου Γεωργίου, Άγιος Γεώργιος
Kartdere Island Güvercin
Kedi Ferdi Islet Kedi Ferdi'nin Adası, Cat Ferdi's Island
Metelik Island Metalik, Metallic, Piti Kayalığı, Pita, Pide, Πήτα
Orak Island Drepanon, Drepano, Drepani, Great Fokia, Rephia, Megalonisi, Alopeki, Μεγάλο Νησί, Αλωπεκή, Δρέπανον, Δρέπανο, Δρεπάνι
Sakızcı Islet Sakızcı Koyu Adacığı
Ildır Gulf Islands Eritre Körfez Adaları, Eritra Körfez Adaları, Ildırı Körfez Adaları, Aldırı Körfez Adaları, Bay of Eritrea Islands
Gerence Gulf Islands Gerence Körfezi Adaları, Mavrovouni (Karadağ), Μαυροβούνι Όρμος
Boş Island Kalp
Cape Çolak Islets Çolak Burnu Adacıkları, Teke Burnu Adacıkları, Karadağ Kayalıkları
Çolak Islets Götoğlan Kayalıkları
Kelek Islet 
Gerence Island Şapka
Karareis Inlet Islets Meli Islands
Mavi Tavşan Islet
Tilki Islet
Hippi Islands Hippous, Hippoi, Atlılar Adaları, Kumuthi, Ίππους των Ιώνων (İyonya Atlıları), Hippoi of Heracles (Herkül Atları)
Çifte Islands Çifte Adalar, Taş Adalar, Apega, İkiz Ada, Απέγα
Çifte Island Apega, Απέγα
Taşlı Island Tasilhli, Thalouse
Ildırı Fener Islet Fener adacığı
Karabağ Island İngiliz, İngilis, Daphnousa, Dafnousa, Δαφνούσα
Sevingül Island Karaağaç
Taş Ada Island
Mustafaçelebi Island Mustafa Çelebi, Çelebi, Onus, Onos, Όνοσ, Ονος
Ufak Islands
Sarıada Islet Sarı Ada, Monavti, Monafti, Μοναυτή
Ufak Island Pırasa, Prasoli, Fener, Πρασόλι
Yassıada Island Yassı, Peta, Πέτα, Makronissi
Kelaynak Island
Küçük Islands
Bayraklı Islet
Kösenin Islet Robinson
Zeki Müren Islet Ardıç, Νησάκι του Ζεκί Μουρέν
Karaadalar Islands
Balta Island Bayta, Küçük Ada, Nisída Méso, Mesonisi, Mercan, Green Island, Μεσονήσι, Μέσο
Küçük Balta Islet
Karaada Island Eşek, Eşşek, Merkep, Goni, Gönye, Göyne, Nísos Góny, Gouni, Kona, Koni, Konana, Gönen, Horse Island, Great Horse Island, Γούνι, Γονί
Kelekçi Kazım Islet
Riko Islet
Yatak Odası Islet Yatak
Toprak Island Nisída Plateiá, Platia, Platya, Plakia, Augusta Island, Πλατεία, Πλατιά, Πλακιά
Uzunadalar Islands Uzun Adaları, Vrachonisídes Makronísia, Makres, Μακρονήσι, Μακρές, Βραχονησίδες Μακρονήσια, βραχονησίδα Μακρονήσι 
Güngör Islet Uzunada
Makri Islet Makri, Makril, No Name, Nonem, Makro, Μάκρη
Uçburun Islands Üçburunlar Adacıkları
Alev Island Toprak, Koumoudi, Kumudi, Vráchos Koumoúthi, Koyun, Camillo Island, Βράχος Κουμούδι
Uçburun Shoals Üçburun Sığlıkları
Karaburun Islands
Büyükada Island Büyük Ada, Sahip, Sahib, Sayip, Tarak, Sagleosa, Sapipa, Sidoussa, Sidousa, Sangilosa
Küçükada Island Küçük, Plati, Flat, Akburun
Sığacık - Doğanbey - Gümüldür Islands
Bahadır Island Palamut, Palamo, Palama, Palamouti, Vrachonisída Pálamo, Παλαμο, Παλαμούτι
Bölme Island Körmen, Sıcak Su, Nisída Makrís, Bolemo, Polemonisi, Makra, Makri, Βολεμό, Μπουλμέ, Μάκρη
Böyük Islet Büyük Ada, Kesre
Çıfıtkalesi Island Çıfıt Kalesi, Çıfıt Kale, Çıfıt, Çifit, Çifitkale, Çiftekale, Çıfıtkale, Çift Kale, Myonnesos, Myon Nisos, Ovriokastro, Fare, Sıçan, Doğanbey, Cüneyd Kalesi, Myonisos, Vrachonisída Myónisos, Μυόννησος, Μυών Νήσος, Οβριόκαστρο
Çiçek Island Kanlıada, Kanlı, Akarca, Hacıvat, Hacıfuti, Hacı Futi, Hacıfoti, Hacıfotis, Xigonidi, Χαδζί Φούτι, Χατζηφούτη, Χατζηφώτη, Ξεγονίδη, Τσιτσέκ
Doğanbey Island Doğan, Tavşan, Hypsili, İpsili, Epsili, Nisída Ypsilí, Apsili, Psili, Aspis, Aspronisi, Arkonesos, Arkonnesos, Akronisos, Ethalia, Polemonisi, Makra, Ἀσπίς, Ασπίς, Ἀρκόνησος, Αρκόννησος, Ακρόνησος, Ασπρονήσι, Υψηλή, Ψηλή, Αψηλή
Eşek Island Eçek, Sıçan, Sığacık
Küçük Islands Küçük Adalar
Ömür Islet Ömür Beldesi Adacığı
Sıçan Island Pondiko, Önce Vatan
Sünger Burnu Islet
Zindancık Islet Jandarma Adası
Urla Islands Englezonisia, Englazomenisia, Εγγλεζονήσια, Εγκλαζομενήσια
Çiçek Islands Nisídes Marathoúses, Nisídes Marathoúsai, Marathussae, Marathoussa, Marathousa, Marathussa, Marathusa, Aprenisi, Μαραδούσα, Μαράθουσσα, Μαραθούσσα, Μαραθούσα, Μαραθούσα, Μαραθούσαι
Akça Island Patates, Tavşan, Akçadağ, Akçaada, Nergis, Nisída Patátes, Patataes, Pita, Pites, Pittes, Imenaios, Ymenaios, Menevo, Melevo, Πατάτες, Πίτες, Πίττες, Νησίδα Πατάτες, Υμέναιος, Μένεβο, Μέλεβο, Ακζαντά
Arap Islands Akçaca, Νησάκια Αράπ Ανταλάρι
Akçaca Island
Güvercin Island
İncirli Island Eşek, Keçi, Gadouronisi, Gaidouronisi, Γαδουρονήσι, Γαϊδουρονήσι
Karantina Island Hastane, Tahaffuzhane, Tahaffushane, Nesos, Clazomenae Adası, Clazomene, Nisída Klazomenaí, Kilizman, Kilizmanya, Cilazman, Kilismani, Klazomen, Klazomena, Klazomenai, Klazomenes, Klazomenon, Klazumni, Klazümen, Qlazumni, Aya Yannis, Agios Ioannis, Άγιος Ιωάννης, Αγιος Ιωάννης, Αϊ-Γιάννης, Αγιο Ιωάννη, Κλαζομεναί, Κιλιζμάνι, Κλαζομενές, Κιλισμάνι, Νησίδα των Κλαζομενών
Körtaş Islands Yılan Adaları, Yılani, Kara Kayalar, Black Islands
Pınarlı Island Pırnallı, Pırnarlı, Pirnally, Pırnalı, Pirnali, Pirnalli, Pournarli, Vourlarli, Yuvarlak, Saint George's, Perdika (Keklik), Partridge Island, Πίρναλι, Πουρναρλί, Πεναρλί, Πέρδικα
Taşada Island Taş
Yassıca Island Alman, Aspronisi, Aya Demetri, Aya Demetrius, Saint Demetri, Saint Demetrius, Saint John's, Yılanca, Yassıca, Gialanegia, Nisída Giasántza, Nisída Yiasándza, Ασπρόνησι, Αλατάς, Αλατά, Αλατα, Γιαλανεγιά, Γιασάντζα
Yolluca Islet Adacık, Yollucaada
Hekim Island Kiliseli, Kilise, Keliseli, Iatronisi, İatronisi, Küçük Urla, Pele, Pali, Pélai, Ιατρονήσι, Γιατρονήσι, Πάλη, Πήλη, Πύλης, Νησί του Γιατρού, Νησιού του Γιατρού, Κιλσαλί
Kel Island Menteş, Kelada, Güvendik, Γκιουβεντί
Uzunada Island Uzun Ada, Köstence, Kösten, Chustan, Keustan, Drymoússa, Drymousa, Drymussa, Droumousa, Drumoússa, Makronísi, Englezonísi, Enclazomenisi, İngiliz, Circis, Jirjis, Büyük Urla, Δρυμούσσα, Δρυμούσα, Δρίμυσσα, Δρύμουσσα, Κιοστέν, Κιοστένι, Κιουστάν Αντά, Εγγλεζονήσι, Εγκλαζομενήσια, Μακρονήσι
Kılıç Islet Kılıç Burnu Kayası, Tribune Rock
Nergis Islet Nergiz Kayalığı, Karavela, Karavelas, Karvelas, Shag, Καραβέλα, Καραβέλας, Καρβέλας, Νησί του Ναρκίσσου
Zafer Islet Zafar Ada, Nisaki, Νησάκι
Yılan Island Yılanlı, Özbek, Hermo, Nisída Érimo, Fidonisi, Φιδονήσι
Karadeniz Islands Karadeniz Adaları, Black Sea Islands
Amasra Islands
Boztepe Island Yassıkaya, Büyük Ada, Μεγάλο Νησί, Μπουγιούκ αντά
Tavşan Islet Lagonisi, Λαγονήσι, Ταβτσάν αντάσι
Giresun Islands
Giresun Island Amazon Adası, Aretias, Areionesos, Areonesos, Aritias, Areonisos, Area, Ares, Arias, Areos Nesos, Chalceritis, Khalkeritis, Puga
Küçükada Islet Çerkez Mevkii Kayalıkları
Palamut Kayası Islet
Kandıra Islands
Bağırkanlı Islets Parganlı, Bağırganlı
Delikkaya Islets
Kefken Island Kerpe, Kirpen, Daphnusia, Dafnousia, Daphnousia, Apollonia, Thynias, Thynia, Δαφνουσία, Ἀπολλωνία, Θυνιάς, Κεφκέν Αντάσι, Κιρπέν, Κεφκένι
Palamar Islet 
Pınarlı Inlet Islets
Sarısu Islet
Uzunkum Islets
Kıyıköy Islands
Kasatura Islet Kastro, Castro, Çamlıkoy
Malatra Islet
Ordu Islands
Fatsa Islet Fatsa Bankı
Hoynat Islet Çaka Hoynat, Karabatak
Sarıyer Islands
Atlamataşı Islet Martı Kayalığı
Kokarankaya Islet
Öreke Taşı Islets Symplegades, Συμπληγάδες, Cyanean Rocks, Cyaneae Insulae, Rokettaşı
Sinop Islands
Gazibey Islet Gazibey Kayası
İnceburun Islets
Sarıada Islet Akliman
Tavşan Islet
Şile & Riva Islands
Akçakese Islets
Eşek Islet Eşek Adası Tombolosu, Balibey Çıkıntısı
İmrenli Inlet Islets
Kilimli Inlet Islets
Riva Island Eşek, Hayırsız, Khairsis, Rheba, Irve
Soğan Island Soğan Adası Tombolosu, Sovak, Sowak Island, Keçilik
Şile Islands
Martı Island Martı Adası
Ocaklı Island Ocaklı Ada
Tavşan Island Tavşan Adası
Zeytin Island Zeytinli Adası
Tirebolu Islands
Tirebolu Islets Kılıç Burnu Kayalıkları
Mersin Islands
Aksaz Island
Ayaş Island Elusa, Elaioussa, Elaiussa, Ελαιούσα, Ελεούσα
Aydıncık Islands Gilindire Adaları, Kelenderis, Üç Kaya, Üç Kayalar
Büyükada Island 
Küçükada Island
Yelkenli Island 
Babadıl Islands Babadil, Babadul, Beşparmak, Papadula, Papadola, Papdola, Papadoúla, Akonesiai
Boğsak Islet Bağsak, Bağsakada, Boğşak, Asteria, Nesoulion, Nesulion, Portus Pini, Fener, λιμὴν Νησούλιον, Άστερήα, Αστερία
Bozyazı Island Bakire Adası, Korsan, Nagidoussa, Nagidousa, Nagidussa, Nagidudos, Nagiduda, Nagidos, Tagiduda, Νάγιδουσα
Dana Island Kargıncık, Kargıcak, Kargacık, Provençal, Manavgat, Manavat, Petrossa, Pityoussa, Pithyussa, Pityussa, Pityusa, Pityusse, Petrossa, Πιτυούσσα, Πιτυούσα
Güvercin Islet
Kızkalesi Island Crambusa, Gramboussa, Gramvoussa, Krambousa, Krambusa, Corycus, Korykos, Κραμπούσα, Γραμβούσσα, Κώρυκος, Κιζκαλεσί
Kösrelik Island Köserelik, Gökada, Güvercinlik
Martı Islet Mamure Adacığı, Mamuriye, Μαμουρέ
Saplı Islet Boynuince Tombolosu, Saplıada
Tisan Island Tisan Yarımadası, Cape Cavaliere, Zephyrium, Aphrodisias, Ovacık, Bölükada
Yılanlı Island Yılan, Spurie
Muğla Islands
Belceğiz Islands Belcekız Adaları
Cape İblis Islet İblis Burnu Kayalığı
Gemiler Island Gemile, Gemili, Kemili, Lebissos, Lebissus, Libyssus, Levissi, Levisus, Lemissos, Karmylassós, Aya Nikola, Ayanikola, Ayios Nikolaos, Ai Nikolao, Aziz Nikola, Aghios Nikolaos, St. Nicholas, Saint Nikolo, San Nikolo, St.Nichola, S. Nicolo, Άγιος Νικόλαος, Άη-Νικόλα, Γκεμιλέρ Αντασί, Νήσος του Γκεμιλέρ, Ληβισσός, Λεβισσός, Λιβυσσός, Καρμύλασσος
Belcekız Islets Belcekız Koyu Kayalıkları
Karacaören Island Karacoren, Karazora, Karazorane, Cissides, Perdicioe, Perdikonisi (Keklik Ada), Kelebek Adası, Περδικονήσι, Καρατζιοράνι
Akvaryum Inlet Islets Akvaryum Koyu Kayalıkları
Bodrum Peninsula Islands
Bodrum Islands
Çelebi Island Cebeli, Tavşan, Δζελεμπή, Δζεμπελί, Τζελεπή
Görecek Island Görecik, İç Ada, İçada, Adaboğazı
Geçit Island Küçük, Akvaryum
Karaada Island Karaada, Kara Ada, Karada, Arkonnesos, Arkonêssos, Arkonisos, Akronisos, Arkos, Arcos, Arkouda, Arkuda, Arconnesus, Καρά Αδά, Καρά-Αντά, Αρκός, Αρκόνησος, Ακρόνησος
Yassıkaya Islet
Orak Island Oraklar, Kargıcık, Kargıçık, Οράκ
Doğu Koyu Islet Orak Doğu Koyu Adacığı 
Kıstak Islet Eşek, Kısık, Küçük Orak, Küçükorak, Κιστάκ
Küçük Kıstak Island Kargıçık Bükü Kayalığı
Yıldız Island Hermo, Pasa, Paşa, Prasa, Şeytan
Cape Baloz Islet Baloz Burnu Adacığı, Mazı
Cape Hurma Islets Hurma Burnu Kayalıkları
Gulf of Güllük Islands
Alagün Island Yüce Ada, Alağün
Anani Island Anami
Gökliman Islet Gökliman Koyu Adacığı
İkiz Islands İkizadalar, İkizceler, İkiz Adalar, İkiz Adaları, Fare Adaları, Torba Adaları
Kıyıkışlacık Peninsula Iasos Yarımadası, Iasos Tombolosu, Iasos Adası
Küçükada Island Vrachonisída Choironísi, Βραχονησίδα Χοιρονήσι
Metelik Island
Pina Peninsula Pina Yarımadası, Pina Adası
Salih Island Salih Ada, Gölcü, Sahil, Caryanda, Karyanda, Karyndas, Taramptos, Taranda, Tarandos, Tarandus, Nísos Tárandos, Darando, Darandos, Τάρανδος, Ταράμπτος, Δάρανδο, Δάρανδος, Κάρυνδας, Καρύανδα
Taş Island Taşada, Taş Adası
Toprak Island Toprak Adası, Toprakada, Vardalkapı, Kapota, Sevingen, Vrachonisída Kapóta
Ufak Island Ufak Ada, Kırmızı Ada, Kırmızıada
Yılan Island 
Ziraat Island
Gümüşlük Islands
Çavuş Island Eski Fener, Eskifener, Kato, Vrachonisída Káto, Fanari, Τσαβούς, Φανάρι, Βραχονησίδα Κάτω
Kardak Islands Kardak Adaları, İkizceler, İkizce Adaları, İkizadalar, Heipethes, Araiai, Arai, Imia, İmia, Ímia, Limnia, Ίμια, Λίμνια, Λιμνιά, Νησίδες Ίμια, Καρντάκ
Pide Island Kadıkalesi, Pitta
Sünger Kayası Islet Ýfalos Sfoungária, Σφουγγάρια
Tavşan Island Myndos, Myndus, Μύνδος
Turgutreis Islands
Çatalada Island Çatal, Çatal Ada, Volo, Karyanda, Krousa, Karabağlar, Βόλο, Τσατάλ
Kuyruk Island Sıçan, Vráchos Ourá, Βράχος Ουρά
Pırasa Island Prassa
Topan Island Zuka, Zouka, Atsaki, Bernal, Τσούκα
Yassı Ada Island Lodo, Lonto, Vrachonisída Lóda, Vrachonisída Plateiá
Yassı Islets Yassı Kayalıkları
Kargı Island Karga, Kargi, Üçyan, Utchian, Cuhûdluk, Cuhudlık, Çıfıtlık, Gümren, Gümrân, Κάργα
Bekçi Kayası Islet
Fare Islet Aspat
Köçek Islet Sığır, Kaya
Paşa Kayalığı Islet Paşa Kayalıkları, Makpiye, Eceuils du Pacha
Tüllüce Islet Tüylüce, Vrachonisída Málathro
Çoban Island Küçük Topan, Küçük Tapan
Güvercin Islet Sumru, Alihoca
Sarıot Island Sariot, Sarıod, Vrachonisída Chroúsov
Türkbükü Islands
Büyük Ada Island Payam, Büyük Badem, Badem, Tokatbaşı
Büyüktavşan Island Apostol, Apastol, Apostal, St. Apostol, Nisída Ágioi Apóstoloi, Áyii Apostóli, Agioi Apostolí, Άγιοι Απόστολοι
Küçük Ada Island Küçük Badem
Küçüktavşan Island Fener, Küçük Tavşan, Mercan, Kamelya, Konel, Konelya
Pırasa Island Kayalıkada
Yalıkavak Islands
Alacain Islets Alacain Kayalıkları
Büyükkiremit Island Ponticusa, Pontikousa (Sıçan), Pondikusa, Kermit, Κερμίτ, Ποντικούσα
Çatal Island Kormen
Gemitaşı Islet
Karga Island
Kızılada Island Kızıl Ada
Kunduz Kayası Islet
Küçükkiremit Island
Payamlık Islets Payamlık Burnu Kayalıkları
Bozburun Bay Islands Bozburun Körfezi Adaları, Yeşilova Körfezi Adaları
Akvaryum Islets Akvaryum Koyu Adaları
Atabol Islet Atabol Kayalığı, Apostol Kayalığı, Cape Apostoli Islet, Ákra Apostólis, Άκρα Αποστόλης
Çakal Islet Karagelme Koyu Adası
İncirli Island
Kızıl Ada Island Kızılada, Vunos, Nisís Vounó, Νησίς Βουνό
Kiseli Island Kiliseli, Kiliselice, Kieli
Oğlanboğuldu Islet
Söğüt Ada Island Kamari, Karmari, Nisís Karmári, Νησίς Καρμάρι
Tavşanbükü Island Tavşan Bükü, Tavşan
Tüysüzce Island Hayırsız
Üçtaş Islands
Değirmen Island Değirmenli
Küçük Değirmen Islet
Suluca Island Sulmed, Sulmen
Taşlıca Island Fenaket, Phoinix
Yeşil Ada Island Misgibi
Zeytin Ada Island
Datça Islands
Northern Datça Islands
Akçalı Island Mordala, Murdala, Akça, Akça Ada, Ceylan, Mundalı
Küçük Akçalı Islet
Balıkaşıran Islet Gökçelerbükü
Ballıcak Islet
Büyük Çatı Islet Büyük Kati Adacığı
Cape Görmen Islet Görmen Burnu Adacığı
Cape Kuzgun Shoal Kuzgun Burnu Sığlığı
Cape Liman Islet Liman Burnu Adacığı
Cape Sedef Islet Sedef Burnu Adacığı, Şedef
Gerence Islet Gelence, Armonika, Harmonica, Αρμόνικα
Gulf of Çilekli Islets
Kızılağaç Island Kuçi, Kuchi, Kutchi
Küçük Çatı Islet Küçük Kati Adacığı
Mersincik Island Murtalan, Murdala, Mordala, Mersinçik
Velibükü Islet
Southern Datça Islands
Ata Islet Som Adası, Plati
Çiftlik Island Aktur Burnu, Adatepe, Τσιφτλίκ
Aslan Islets Aslan Kayalıkları, Adatepe Burnu Kayalıkları 
Dişlice Island Diş Adası, Dişli Ada, Aşk Adası, Vrachonisída Kofinítsa
Bencik Islet Bencik Adacığı, Küçük Dişlice Kayalığı
Esenada Promontory Esen Ada, Esenada, Datça İskelesi, Datça Limanı, Stadia, Tadya, Dadya, Dadça, Ντάτσα
Karaincir Islands Karainciz
Kurucu Islets Kurucubükü Adaları, Kurucabük Kayalıkları
Kurucubükü Islets Kurucubükü Kayalıkları
Palamutbükü Island Baba Ada, Barbanikola, Barba Nikola, Bük Adası, Bükü Adası, Palamutbükü Adası, Vrachonisída Bármpa Nikólas, Polypodousa
Sarıliman Island Sazıliman
Tavşan Island Thiáspori, Vrachonisída Thiáspori
Tekir Island Deveboynu Burnu, Cape Crio, Cap Creou, Cape Kriyo, Cape Krio, Knidos, Cnidus, Triopion, Τριόπιον Νήσον, Τριόπιο, Κάβο Κριός, Κνίδος Καρίας
Topanca Islet
Yassı Ada Island Yassı Ada, Yassı Adası, Yassıcaada, Perili Ada, Periliköşk
Yolluca Island Ayak Adası
Uzunca Islet Uzunce, Datça Fener Adası, Feneradası
Gulf of Gökova Islands
British Harbour Islands İngiliz Koyu Adaları
Ballısutaşı Islet
Çamlı Ada Island Camlı Ada
Çiçekli Island Çiçekli Koyu Adacığı
Kara Ada Island Karaada, Karaka, Kâhya, İncirliada, Dairi, Pelit Adası
Köremen Islets Körmen
Zeytinli Island Babaşen Adası
Çatal Island
Gelibolu Island Çamlı Ada, Tavşan, Kallipolis, Kαλλίπολη
Hasanhüseyin Island
Karaca Island Karacaada, Yalı Adası, Yelu, Karjah, Καρατζά
Karamuk Islet Koyun Burnu Kayalığı
Şehir Islands Şehir Oğlan Adaları, Şehir Adaları, Isole dei Serpenti e del Castello
Orta Island Orta Ada, Ortaada, Orata, Yuan, Fenerli, Fener
Küçük Island Kale, Castle
Sedir Island Saray, Şehir, Şehirada, Şehroğlu, Şehroğlan, Şehiroğlanı, Gülen Ada, Şiir Adası, Aşk Adası, Balayı Adası, Kleopatra, Cleopatra, Cleopatra's Island, Sedrea, Sedre, Kedreai, Kedrai, Kedrae, Kedreae, Cedrae, Sideyri, Κεδρέαι, Κεδρείαι, Κλεοπάτρα, Νησί της Κλεοπάτρας, Σεντίρ
Tuzla Inlet Islands Tuzla Koyu Adaları
Adalı Islet Adalı Koyu Adacığı
Fener Islet Fener Koyu Adacığı
Tuzla Islet Tuzla Koyu Adası
Yediadalar Islands Yedi Adaları, Yeşil Adalar, Eptanisos, Eptanisa, Ἑπτάνησος, Ἑπτάνησα, Επτά Νησιά
Göllü Ada Island
Göllü Islets
Deka Islet
Küçük Göllü Islet
Küçük Ada Island
Martılı Ada Island
Uzun Ada Island
Zeytinli Ada Island
Hisarönü Bay Islands
Hisarönü Islands
Kameriye Island Kamerye, Kameriya, Karamea, Karani, Kamelya, Kemriye, Kamerie, Kamenye, Camellia, Καμέλια, Καμέρια
Kameriye Islet Kameriye Kayalığı, Kuyu
Kargı Island Kadı, Girneyit Koyu Adası
Koca Ada Island Kocaada, Kalogeri, Kaloyeri, Καλόγερι
Topan Island
Uzun Ada Island Uzunada Mikale, Mycale, Mykale, Mykali, Μυκάλη
Kale Island Tavşan Adası, Orhaniye, Keçibükü, Kırvasil, Bybassos, Βυβασσός, Βύβαστος, Βουβασσός, Βουβαστός
Kargı Islet Delikliyol Koyu Adası, Losto, Losta
Selimiye Islet Gözlem Adası, Hydas
Kabak Inlet Islets
Aktaş Islets Aktaş Kayalıkları
Boncuklu Islet Kabak Koyu Adacığı
Marmaris & Dalaman Islands
Aksaz Islands
Aksaz Island
Horoz Island Horos, Pyrnos, Leucopagos
Baba Island Baba Ada, Papas, Papas nisi, Adatepe, Παπάς
Kamil Island Tavşan Adacığı, Dişbilmez
Delik Island Dalyan, Akiye Burnu Adası, Delikada, Delikli Kaya, Calbis, Νταλιάν
Nar Island Narada, Rothea
Peksimet Island Paximadi, Paximathi, Παξιμάδί, Παξιμάδα
Yılancık Island Rhodoussa, Rhodussa, Rhopusa, Rodusa, Ropusa, Ropousa, Linosa, Yılan, Ροδοῦσσα, Ροδοῦσσαι, Λινόσα
Devetaşı Shoals Devetaşı Sığlığı
Turnalı Islet Turnalıkayası, Turnalı Kayası
Marmaris Gulf Islands
Bedir Island Uzun Ada, Bedir Adası, Marmaris Adası, Long Island
Fener Islet Fener Adası, Keçi Adası Fener Kayalığı, Keçiada Feneri
Heaven Island Yıldız, Cennet, Paradise, Adaköy, Nimara, Nymara, Nimera, Nimada, Ada Yarımadası, Nimara Yarımadası, Yıldız Tombolosu
Karga Island Karga Adası, Karga Adacığı, Karga Kayalığı, Kargataşı
Keçi Island Uğur Adası
Onikiada Islands Oniki Adalar, Fethiye Körfezi Adaları, Meğri Adaları, Makri Körfezi Adaları, Katrancı Inlet Islands, Μάκρης
Balaban Island Βαλαβάν, Βαλαβάνη
Dökükbaşı Islet Dökükbaşı Adacığı
Deliktaş Islands Diliktaş, Delikli, Dikilitaş, Deliklitaş Adaları, Delikli Adalar
Deliktaş Island Diliktaş, Delikli, Dikilitaş, Deliklitaş, Didymae, Didymæ, Didymai, Δίδυμα
Günlükbaşı Island
Nergisli Island
Tavşan Island Helbo, Helboscope, Helioscope, Ηλιοσκόπιο
İz Islet İz Kayası Sığlığı, İzkayası
Karanlıkiçi Islands
Domuz Island Yeronisi, Hierónisi, Choironísi, Iero, Ropisa, Prens, Hürriyet, Simavi, Nero Nisi, Ρόπισα, Χοιρονήσι
Mercan Islet Hacıdede
Göbün Islet Göbin, Göben, Kapı, Kapi, Keppi
Göcek Island Gök Ada, Göçek, Köçek, Köycek, Küçük, Küçükada, Saint Kiriaki, Agia Kyriaki, Agio Kisiachi, Mallionisi, Melanoscope, Melanoscopium, Scope, Skopea, Αγία Κυριακή, Γιοτζέκ, Μαλλιονήσι
Hacıhalil Island Zeytin, Zeytinli, Karysis, Carysis, Cari
Şeytanlı Island Şeytan
Tersane Island Tershane, Tarsana, Telandria, Telandros, Telandrus, Tersanah, Νησιά Τερσανέ, Τελάνδρος, Ταρσανά
Yassıca Islands Yassıcalar, Stavro, Stavro Nisia, Jessica Adaları, The Cross Islands, Haç Adaları, Flat Islands, Νησιά Γιάσσιτζα
Belenpınar Island Belenpınar Adası
Belenpınar Islets Belenpınar Kayalıkları
Büyük Yassıca Island Yassıca, Alina, Kryeon Nisi (Soğuk Ada), Κρυέων Νῆσοι
Eşek Island
Gözleme Island
Kızılada Island Kızıl Ada, Kazil Ada
Küçük Island Küçük Ada
Yılanlı Island Topan, Tetranot Islet
Katrancı Island Katrancık, Aspis, Avthokea, Ασπίς
Küçük Katrancı Islet
Kızılada Island Lagussa, Lagusa, Lagousa, Kızlan, Kızlanada, Λαγούσα, Κιζίλατα
Şövalye Island Şovalye, Fethiye, Zeytin, Uzun Ada, Makri, Makra, Macris, Meğri, Eskimeğri, Eski Meğri, Palaio Mákri, Isle des Chevaliers, Cavalier, Cavalière, Kavaliere, Παλαιό Μάκρη
Balık Islet Balık Kayası, Çalış
Southern Bozburun Islands
Arap Island Araba, Arab Adası, Alausa, Eleoussa
Cape Akçaan Islets Akçaan Burnu Kayalıkları 
Cape Kumluburun Islets Kumlu Burun Kayalıkları
Çatal Islands Çatal Adaları, Çataladalar, Çatalca Adaları
Çiftlik Island Çiftlikbükü, Τσιφτλίκ
İnceburun Promontory İnce Ada, Gebekse
Kadırga Gulf Islet Kadırga Koyu Kayalığı
Kargataşı Island Dilek Adası, Dilekada, Kargı
Kızılada Island Elesa, Elaioussa, Vonos, Ελαιούσα, Ελαιούσσα, Ελεούσα, Ελεούσσα, Ελέους, Ελεούς, Ελέσα
Korsan Gulf Islet Kırlangıç, Korsan Koyu Adacığı
Sarımersin Gulf Islets Sarımersin Koyu Kayalıkları
North Aegean Islands (Turkish Part) Boğazönü Adaları, Porthmos
Bozcaada Island Leukophrys, Tenedos, Tenedhos, Boğçaada, Τένεδος
Ayana Islets Ayana Kayalıkları
Baklataşı Islet Baklataş, Habbele, Ayadimitri, Aya Dimitri, Saint Dimitri
Eşek Islands
Küçük Eşek Island Little Gadaro, Nisída Mikrós Gáidaros
Ortafener Island Büyük Eşek, Eşek, Orta Fener, Gadaro, Gaidaro, Gaydaro, Great Gadaro, Nisída Gáidaros, Orta
Horoz Islets Horoz Taşları
Gökçe Islet Kökçe, Streblos, Nisída Strevló
Kaşık Islet Kemal
İncirli Islet
Ocean Rock Okyanus Kayası
Sıçan Islet Petro, Pedro, Sıçancık, Sıçançıkkaya, Vrachonisída Pontikáki
Şimal Rock Şimal Kayası, Shimal
Talbot Rock Talbot Kayası
Taş Island Taşada, Katranlık
Yıldız Island Keraki, Mavna, Mauna, Mavuna, Killik, Nisída Choiráki
Zorlu Islet Tuzburnu
Gökçeada Island İmroz, Imbros, Imvros, Ίμβρος
Aydıncık Promontory Aydıncık Tombolosu, Kefalo, Cape Kephalo, Kefalos Burnu, Kefaloz
Tavşan Islands Mavria, Mavriya, Mavreiá, Mavri, Mfrhy, Mauria, Manerya, Mağrip, Merkep, Eşek, Kalydnai, Kalydnae, Kalidne, Lagussae, Lagusae, Lagonísia, Kounelonísia, Karayer Adaları, Rabbit, Tacohan, Μαυριά, Λαγούσες, Μαυρυές
Aird Shoals Ayrd Sığlıkları
Aldridge Rock Aldriç
Mansell Shoal Mansel Sığlığı
Orak Island Drépano, Derepano, Δράπανο
Pırasa Island Práso, Presa, Sıçancık, Sıçanlık, Western, Πράσο, Piresa
Tavşan Island Merkep, Eşek, Mávro, Mavri, Mavriya, Mavria, Mağrip, Kara Ada, Great Rabbit, Μαύρη, Μαύρο, Λαγούσα
Yılan Island Feidonísi, Phido, Fido, Yılancık, Φιδονήσι
Saros Islands Üçadalar, Eşek Islands, Muarız, Muariz, Saroz, Xeros, Xironísia
Böcek Island Minik, Minnoş
Kaşık Island Hedef, Yunus, Büyük Ada
Ortanca Island Defne, Küçük Ada
 Islands of Lake Beyşehir
 East Side
Akburun Island Ömer Çavuş
Gölkaşı Islands
Çeçen Island Terkenli, Telkenli, Rumterkenli, Aşağıağıl, Hacı Osman, Gavur
Gölkaşı Island Kıstıfan, Stefanos, Külbent, Gülbend
Gül Islet
Kum Islet
Manarga Islet
Höyük Island Hüyük
Kül Islet Adacık
Yılanlı Island Yılan
 West Side
Gölyaka Village Islets
Geyik Islet
Kızkulesi Islet Kızkalesi
Kum Islet Eşek, İkinci Eşek Adası
Kes Islands Kes Adaları, İçeri-Dışarı Adaları, Köy Adaları
İçeri Island
Kes Island
Kurucaova Village Islands
Hacı Akif Island Hacıâkif Adası
Çifteadalar Islands Çifte Adalar
Hatibin Island
Keltaş Islet
Helimin Island
Karaada Island
Kızılada Island Orta Ada
Tekada Island
Mada Island Kazak, Uzun Ada, Kumluca Adası, Gedikli
Eşek Island Birinci Eşek Adası
Kirse Islet Kilise, Adacık
Üçadalar Islands
Aygır Island
İğdeli Island
Orta Island
 Islands of Lake Eğirdir
Akkeçili Islet
Bülbül Island Bölükada
Can Island Mikro Nisi, Canada, Camada
Hatip Island Tırtar, Gazili, Gaziri, Hatılı, Hoyran, Limnai, Limnae, Limenea, λιμένεα, Λιμναε
Sıyrıncak Islet
Yeşil Island Yeşilada, Nis Aya, Nisi, Nis, Nisi Agia, Büyük Ada
 Islands of Lake Köyceğiz
Eşek Islet
Gavur Island Pagan, Köyceğiz Koyu, Köyceğiz Köyü
Gavurbağ Island Gavur Bağı, Bağ Adası, Hapishane, Aşık Adası, Prison Island
Gedova Island Gedikova, Yehova
Tütün Islet
 Islands of Lake Uluabat
Alyos Island Keşiş, Saint Theodore, Halilbey, Halil Bey, Aliosta, Alios, Agios Theodoros, Tahir Ağa, Agiou Theodorou tou Kanariti, Hagios Theodoros, Ağa, Aga, Aya
Arifmolla Island Molla Efendi
Bulut Island Manakouda
Heybeli Island Besidamı
Kerevit Islands Karavida, Karabida, Büyük ve Küçük Kerevit Adaları, Kerevitli, Keremitçi, Kiremitçi
Kız Island Thasion
Manastır Island Nailbey, Saint Constantine, Nail Bey, Mutlu Ada, Hagios Constantinos, Agiou Konstantinou kai Elenis, Agiou Konstantinou, Agias Elenis
Şeytan Island Kipoudi
Terzioğlu Island Süleyman Efendi
 Islands of Lake Van
Adır Island Lim, Yaka
Ağak Islet Agak
Akdamar Island Ahtamar, Ağtamar, Aghtamar, Akhtamar, Aktamar, Ahtamara, Rştunik
Çarpanak Island İçeriçarpanak, Ktouts, Ktuts, Gıduts, Gduts Anabad, Anapat, Charkhapan
Kuş Island Arter, Kuzu
Küçük Akdamar Islet
 River Islands
Kirazlık Island Zevgar

Lakes
Lake Acıgöl Çardak, Sanaos, Anaua
Lake Akdoğan Hamurpet
Lake Akşehir Philomela, Saranta Martyron, Tessarakonta Martyron, Saranta Martyres (Kırk Şehitler), Σαράντα Μάρτυρες
Lake Aktaş Hazapin, Hozapin, Khozapini, Kartsakhi, Kenarbel, Karsak, Kazapin, Kozapini
Lake Bafa Çamiçi, Vafi Denizi, Λίμνη βαφή, λίμνη Μπάφα, Milesia Limne
Lake Balık Gaylatu, Masiyan, Koghovit
Lake Beyşehir Koralis, Karalis, Karalitis, Caralitis, Skleros, Pusguse
Lake Burdur Ascanius, Ascania, Askania
Lake Çıldır Hüsiso, Gürciyan, Hujujan, Çrdilo, Hüsisayin, Tseli, Tsovak lič, Črdilis tba, Palakatzis
Lake Durusu Terkos
Lake Erçek Ardjag, Archak, Ardjishag, Artsiskah
Lake Efteni Daphnusis, Eflania, Eftani
Lake Eğirdir Eğridir, Akrotiri, Akroteri, Akroterion, Prostanna, Prostaina, Limnai, Limnae, Limenea, λιμένεα, Λιμναε
Lake Hoyran North part of Lake Eğirdir
Lake Eymir Eymür
Lake Haçlı Kazan, Bulanık
Lake Hazar Gölcük Gölü, Sivrice, Şupa, Sophene, Dsovk, Tsovk
Lake Işıklı Çivril
Lake Iznik İznik, Askania, Ascanius, Ascanios, Ascania, Ασκάνια, Asson
Lake Karagöl Tantalus, Tántalos, Tantalís
Lake Manyas Kuş Gölü, Afnitis, Aphnitis, Artynia, Daskylitis, İlyas, Ma-i İlyas
Lake Ladik Stiphane Limne, Stifane Gölü, Stephane, Stefan, İstefan
Lake Marmara Gyges, Gygaean, Coloe, Koloe, Gyngaia, Gygaia
Lake Mogan Gökçegöl, Mugan, Gölbaşı, Ma'an
Lake Nar Nêroassós, Narassa, Nakrassa
Lake Salda Aulindenos, Aulocrene, Aulutrene
Lake Sapanca Voani, Voana, Boane, Sofon, Siphon, Sophon, Siphonensis Lacus, Βοάνη, Βοάνα, Σαπάντζα
Lake Seyfe Malya
Lake Suğla Suğla, Karaviran, Trogitis, Trochitis
Lake Tuz Almira, Almyra, Tatta, Tatta Limne, Karateia Limne, Αλμυρά Λίμνη
Lake Uluabat Apolyont Gölü, Ulubat, Apollonia, Apollonias, Apolonya, Aboulonia, Artynia
Lake Uzungöl Saraho, Şaraho, Sarahos, Sarakho, Şerah
Lake Van Thospitis Lacus, Arsissa Lacus, Arčeš, Bznunik, Bznounik, Rshtunik, Tosp, Bznunyats, Bıznunyats, Biaina
Turkish Lakes Region Göller Bölgesi, Göller Yöresi, Psidia, Pisidya

Mounts
Akdağlar Mountains, Akdağ, Krágos, Cragus, Κράγος
Aladağlar Antitauros, Anti-Taurus Mountains
Aydın Mountains Messogis
Acıgöl–Nevşehir Topada, Dobada Mons
Babadağ Mountain Cragos, Cragus, Kragus, Kragos, Hiera Acra, Mendos, Antíkrágos, Anticragus, Κράγος, Ιερά Άκρα, βουνό Κράγος, Μπαμπαδάγκ
Beşparmak Mountains Latmus, Latmos, Phthires
Boztepe Hill Minthrion, Minthron, Mithraion, Mithrion, Mithriou Orous
Giresun Mountains Paryadres
Ilgaz Mountains Olgassys, Olgasos, Olygassys
Istranca Mountains Istrancalar, Yıldız Dağları, Strandzha
Kaçkar Mountains Kaçkarlar, Khachkar, Haçkar
Küre Mountains İsfendiyar
Madra Mountains Pindasos
Mount Ağrı Ararat, Ağırdağ, Eğridağ, Nuh Dağı, Masis, Mets Masis, Akra, Akre
Mount Alamandağ Galesios, Galesion, Γαλήσιος, Γαλήσιον, Γαλήσιο
Mount Bozdağ Bozdağ, Tmolos, Tmolus, Τμῶλος
Mount Cudi Kardu, Judi
Mount Çadır Çadırdağ, Artos
Mount Bülbüldağ Koressos
Mount Davraz Davras
Mount Dilek Dilek Dağı, Samsun Dağı, Samson, Mycale, Mykale, Mykali, 
Mount Erciyes Argaeos, Argaeus, Argaios
Mount Ali: Alidağı, Parseğ, Áyios Vasílios, Sabas, Asib
Mount Hasan Argaios, Athar
Mount Honaz Cadmus, Cadmos, Kadmos, Κάδμος
Mount Kale Kale Tepe, Arisama, Ardistama
Mount Kartepe Keltepe, Kel Tepe
Mount Kaz Kazdağı, Kaz Dağı, Zeybek, Ida, Gargara Akron
Mount Kel Keldağ, Kel Dağı, Jebel Aqra, Cebel-i Akra, Hazzi, Sapan, Zaphon, Casius, Kasios, Gassios
Mount Kurt Ligoras, Lycoras
Mount Küçük Ağrı Sis, Aşağı Ararat, Pok’r Ararat, Little Ararat
Mount Madur Theches, Thekhes
Mount Mahya Mahya, Mahiada
Mount Musa Musa Dağ, Cebel Musa, Musa Ler
Mount Nemrut Nemrut, Nemrud, Nimrod, Nimrud
Mount Nif Nif Dağı, Kemalpaşa Dağı
Mount Nenezi Nenezi Dağı, Nenezi Mons, Nazianzus Mons
Mount Palandöken Paltokan
Mount Simav Temnos, Temnus
Mount Spil Manisa Dağı, Sipylus
Mount Süphan Sipan, Süpan, Nekh Masik
Mount Tahtalı Olimpos Dağı
Mount Tendürek Tondrak
Mount Topçambaba Baba Dağı, Madran, Cadmus, Cadmos, Kadmos, Κάδμος
Mount Uludağ Olimpos, Keşiş Dağı, Cebel-i Ruhban, Keşişdağ, Keşişdağı, Olympus, Olympos, Mysia Olymposu
Mount Yamanlar Amanariotissa, Genikon, Amanara
Mount Yanartaş Kimera, Himera, Chimaera
Munzur Mountains Mındsur, Mercan
North Anatolian Mountains Kuzey Anadolu Dağları, Pontus Alpleri, Parhar Dağları, Paryadres, Parihedri, Doğu Karadeniz Dağları, Pontic Mountains
Nur Mountains Amanos, Amanus, Gavur Dağları
Samanlı Mountains Arganthonio, Arganthonios, Argantonyos, Argantonyus, Samanlıdağ
Toros Mountains Toroslar, Tauros, Taurus Mountains
Yalnızçam Mountains Arsiani Range, Arsianis
Zağros Mountains Zagros, Gortvats, Zakrosh, Zagroj

Peninsulas, Capes
Biga Peninsula Troad, Teruvad, Truvada, Troas
Bodrum Peninsula Strobilos, Cape Termerium
Bozburun Peninsula Poseidônion, Aphrodisias, Ἀφροδισιάς
Cape Arıburnu İlyas Baba, Mehmetçik Burnu, Cehennem Burnu, Cape Helles, Hallesi, Helas, Ilias Baba
Cape Atabol Bozburun, Boz Burnu, Apostoli
Cape Baba Baba Burnu, Lekton, Bababurun, Babakale, Lectum, Cape Lecture, Chrysa, Göztepe
Cape Bozburun, Armutlu Posidium
Cape Boztepe Sinop Burnu, Scopelus
Cape Çolak Çolak Burnu, Corynaeum
Cape Doğanbey Tripiti, İpsili, Myonnesus, Makria
Cape Eğribucak Kabyli Akra, Kampyli Akra, Kambyli Akra, Καμπύλη Άκρα, Εγρί Μποτζάκ
Cape Gelidonya Gelidonya Burnu, Taşlık Burnu, Taşlıkburnu, Kırlangıç Burnu, Şilidonya, Kilidonya, Kelidonya, Khelidonia, Chelidonia, Chelidoniae, Chelidonium Promontorium, Kilidonia, Killidonia, Sillidoni, Caput de Sillidoni, Hiera Acra, Hiera Akra, Tauri Promontorium, Yardımcı, Akrotiri ton Chelidonion, Ακρωτήρι των Χελιδονιών, Χελιδόνια, Χελιδονία Άκρη, Χελιδονία Άκρα, Ακρωτήριο Χελιδόνια, Γκελιντόνια, Ιερού Ακρωτηρίου (Sacred Cape)
Cape İnce İnceburun, Lepte Burnu, Leptes, Lepti Akra, Akra Lepti, Akroulepti, Syrias, Gerna, Başyöz
Cape İncir İncirburnu, İnceburun, Avlaka Burnu
Cape Işıklı Kelağra Burnu, Kelagra, Kelara, Galara, Gelera, Galaza
Cape Kaleardı Dilvarda, Cilvarda, Dildarde, Kiloarda, Dildade, Dıldare, Alaya
Cape Karaburun Calaberno, Melaina
Cape Kerempe Kerempe Burnu, Kerembe, Karambis
Cape Kiraz Kiraz Burnu, Cape Congi, Keretses, Κερετσές
Cape Nara Nara Burnu, Nağara, Nagara, Point Pesquies, Boğaz Hisar, Abidos, Abydos, Abidus, Abydos, Abydus
Cape Top Top Burun, Top Burnu, Mesate
Cape Usta İstefan Burnu, İstafan Burnu
Cape Yason Iason, Jason, Iason
Cape Yum Yum Burnu, Yon Point, Hrom Point, Ancyræan Cape, Ancyræan Promontory, Cape Psomion
Çatalca Peninsula Paşaeli, Bosfor
Datça Peninsula Reşadiye, Dorian Peninsula, Cnidos Peninsula, Chersonisos Cnidia, Tarahya, Tarahiya, Darahya, Darahiya, Trachia, Trakheia, Trakhei, Κνιδίας Χερσονήσου, Τραχεία Χερσόνησος
East Part of Datça Peninsula Dadya, Dadiya, Stadia, Stadea, Statea, Statia, Tadya, Tadiya, Dadça, Datça
West Part of Datça Peninsula Betçe, Bedye, Bedya, Patya, Becce, Poça, Peçe, Püçe, Yenice
Dilek Peninsula Trogilium, Kanapiçe, Kanapitza
Gelibolu Peninsula Gelibolu Yarımadası, Hersones, Gallipoli, Chersonesus Thracica
Hakkıbey Peninsula Tımarhane Adası,  Agia Paraskevi, Aya Paraskevi, Taşlı Manastır, Sarımsak
Kapıdağ Peninsula Kapudağ, Kizikos, Kyzikos, Kizikini, Arktonnesus, Arktonnisos, Arctonnesos, Arktonnesos (Ayı Adası), Arkton Oros (Ayılar Dağı), Preme, Pereme
Kapıdağ Peninsula, Dalaman Lydai
Karaburun Peninsula Erythraia, Eritrea
Kısık Peninsula Lebedus, Lebedos
Sarayburnu Seraglio Point, Cape Seraglio
Yediburun Γεντιμπουρούν, Επτά Κορυφές

Regions, Plains, Others
Amik Valley Amuk, Amuq, al-A’maq
Bahçe Pass Amanus Pass, Amanian Gate, Amanides Pylae, Amanikai Pylai, Amanides Pyles
Barz Plain Sparza, Sparzênê
Bolu Plain Salonia Campus
Ihlara Valley Peristrema-Tal
Kelebekler Valley Kelebekler Vadisi, Güdürümsu, Butterfly Valley, Faralya, Farilya, Perdicia, Perdikiai, Perdiciis, Artymnissos
Güvercinlik Vadisi Vasil Potamus, Vasil Stream, Basilius
Kadıkalesi Temenni Tepe
Paşabağları Monks Valley
Çukurova Kilikya, Cilicia, Aleian plain
Dupnisa Cave Dupnitsa, Dunnitsa
Gülek Pass Gülek Boğazı, Kilikya Kapısı, Kilikya Geçitleri, Pylae Ciliciae, Cilician Gates, Pylai Kilikias, Darb as Salama
Galata Tower Christea Turris, Isa Kule, Megalos Pyrgos
İmerhev Valley İmerhev Vadisi, Imerkhevi
Kazova Dazimonitis
Likya Likya, Lisiya, Lukka, Teke, Teke Yarımadası, Lycia
Livane Valley Livâne Vadisi, Livana, Ligani, Nigal, Nigali
Macahel Maçahel, Machakheli, Macaheli, Maçaheli, Mach'akheli, Michikhiani, Bicihiani
Taşeli Cilicia Trachea

Rivers
Aksu River Kestros, Kastaraya, Cestrus, Κέστρος, Aκ σου
Anamur River Anamur Çayı, Dragon Çayı, Kocaçay
Aras River Araxes, Araxis, Araks, Arax, Arsa, Yeraskh, Rakhsi, Erez, Eres, Araz, Ava Reş
Arda River Ardiscus, Árdas
Arpaçay River Arapçayı, Ahuryan, Akhurian
Bakırçay River Kaikos, Astraeus, Astra, Caicus, Caecus, Seha, Aksu, Κάϊκος, Ἀστραῖος
Batman River Kalat, Nimfeos, Satidama
Bartın River Parthenius, Parthenios, Gökırmak
Berdan River Tarsus Çayı, Cydnus, Kydnos, Κύδνος, Baradan, Barada
Biga River Kocabaş Çayı, Granikos, Barenos, Can, Çan, Granicus, Γρανικὸς
Botan River Uluçay, Bohtan, Eastern Tigris, Doğu Dicle
Bozyazı River Sini
Büyük Menderes River Meander, Maeander, Maíandros, Μαίανδρος
Ceyhan River Piramos, Lefkosirus, Pyramos, Pyramus, Leucosyrus, Jihun
Çine River Marysas, Marsyas
Çoruh River Akampsis, Boas, Harpasos, Çuruk, Çorok, Çorokh, Chorokhi, Tsorokh
Çürüksu River Lykos, Lycus, Λύκος
Dalaman River Índos, Talaman
Dalyan River Calbis
Değirmendere River Piksidis, Piksitis, Pyxitis, Pyxites
Delice River Cappadox, Kappadox
Dicle River Tigra, Tigira, Idigna, Idigina, Idiqlat, İdiglat, İdiklat, Deqlat, Dijlah, Hudaqil, Diglath, Dglat, Tigres, Hiddekel, Aranzah, Dijla, Tigr, Dejle, Tigris
Ergene River Agrianes
Eşen River Xanthos, Sibros, Sirbis, Sirbe
Fırat River Yeprat, Buranuna, Buranun, Purattu, Al-Furat, Al-Furrat, Perat, Firat, Eufrates, Ufratu, Puranti, Uruttu, Huperethuua, Euphrates
Filyos River Billaios, Billaeus
Gediz River Hermos, Hermus, Kadis, Hermon
Gelevara River Gelivera, Gelivar, Gelevera, Özlüce, Gelevar, Gelava, Gelenvar
Gök River Gökırmak, Amnias, Amneus
Gökpınar River Cadmus, Cadmos, Κάδμος
Göksu Creek Aretòs
Göksu River Salef, Kalikadnus, Saleph, Calycadnus, Kalykadnos, Καλύκαδνος
Gönen River Aisipos, Aisepos, Aesepus, Αίσηπος, Agonya, Kocaçay
Güzelhisar River Pytikos
Habur River (Dicle) Khabur, Xabûr
Habur River (Fırat) Al-Khabur, Büyük Habur, Batı Circip, Abor, Kabour, Abour, Rhesaenae, Chaboras, Khabur
Harşit River Doğankent, Philabonites, Charsiotis, Χαρσιώτης
Havran River Euenos
Jaghjagh River Çağçağ Deresi, Çağ Çağ Deresi
Kâğıthane Stream Barbisos
Kahta River Nymphaios
Karamenderes River Skamandrios, Skamandros, Scamander, Xanthos, Skamander, Küçük Menderes, Eski Menderes, Dumbrek, Thymbrius, Θύμβριος
Karasu River, Euphrates Western Euphrates, Batı Fırat, Telebóas, Batı Yeprat
Karasu River, Sinop Ochthomanes, Ochosbanes
Karıncaçay River Olloios
Kazandere River Podima 
Kelkit River Lykus, Lykos, Lycus, Gayl Get, Kayl Ked, Kayl Ket
Kızılırmak River Halis, Alis, Halys, Alys, Marashantiya
Melendiz River Potamus Kapadukus
Damsa Stream Damsa, Tamisa, Tomissos
Kocaçay River Penkalas, Kısıkboğaz Deresi
Kocadere River Değirmendere, Veleka
Köprüçay River Efrimedon, Eurymedon, Evrimedon, Εὐρυμέδων
Kura River Mtkvari, Kür, Cyrus, Kyros, Kurosh
Kurbağalıdere Stream Chalcis, Chalcedon
Küçükmenderes River Kaystros, Kayster, Astarpa, Caystrus, Cayster, Castur, Kastur
Limonlu River Lamos, Lamus, Lamis, Λάμος
Manavgat River Til, Melas
Manyas River Kocaçay, Madra, Tarsios, Tarsius, Tarza, Karadere, Karasu
Mastura River Mastaura, Krizoroas, Chrysaoras, Altın Kılıçlı Dere, Μάσταυρα
Melen River Hypius, Hypios, Milan
Melendiz River Melentiz, Uluırmak, Kapadukus
Meriç River Evros, Marica, Hébros, Hebrus, Evgos, Ebros, Maritza, Maritsa
Murat River Aratsani, Aradzani, Eastern Euphrates, Doğu Fırat, Arsanias, Arșania, Doğu Yeprat, Aradsani
Mustafakemalpaşa River Adirnaz, Orhaneli, Kirmasti, Rindakus, Rindakos, Rindakoz, Adernaz, Rhyndacus, Rýndakos, Adırnaz, Adırnas, Kocasu, Rhyndacos, Rhyndakos, Ῥύνδακος
Mutludere River Paspalderesi, Rezve, Rezovska, Rezveya, Rezovo
Nilüfer River Odrisses, Horisyus, Odris, Odrysses, Odrys, Horisius, Niloufer, Aras Suyu
Asi River Orontis, Orontos, Arantu, Araunti, Axius, Typhon, Orient, Orontes
Payas River Pinaros, Pinarus
Porsuk River Tymbris, Thymvros, Termbris, Terabris
Riva Stream Rheba, İrve, İrva
Sakarya River Sangarius, Sangarios, Sangaria, Sangaryos, Sagar
Sart River Pactola, Pactolus, Πακτωλός
Seydisuyu River Seydi Suyu
Seyhan River Sarus, Saros, Sihun, Σάρος 
Simav River Susurluk, Çapraz Çayı, Makestos, Mihalıç, Mikalick, Macestus, Mékestos, Μέκεστος
Sürmene River Manahos
Taşlıdere River Salaha, Askoroz, Askoros, Engindere
Terme River Thermodon
Tunca River Tunca, Tonzos, Tonsus, Tundzha
Tuzla River Satnioeis
Yeşilırmak River İris
Zamantı River Karmalas, Parkıtis, Dsamındav, Dzamıntav, Simandu, Tsamandos

Straits, Seas
Boğaziçi Strait İstanbul Boğazı, Bosphorus, Bosporus, Bosporos, Bousporos, Bosforus, Bosferus, Bosphore, Bósforo, Bosfor, Damaliten Bosporon, Prosphorion, Constantinople, Bosporus Thracius, Bosporus Thraciae, Bosporos Thrakios, Bosporus Chalcedoniae, Bosporos tes Khalkedonies, Bosporus Mysius, Mecma’ul-Bahreyn, Kostantiye Halici, Kostantiniye Halici
Çanakkale Strait Çanakkale Boğazı, Dardanelles, Dardanel, Hellespont, Dardanelya, Hellespontus, Hellespontos, Hellesponto
Dilek Strait Darboğaz, Sisam Boğazı, Mycale Strait, Steno tis Mykalis
Kaş Channel Kaş Kanalı, Kaş Boğazı, Steno Vathi
Sea of Marmara Propontis, Marmora, Peropontit, Mormora

References

External links
 Index Anatolicus - interactive map showing naming history of many populated places and geographical features (Turkish text)
 Digital Atlas of the Roman Empire - interactive map showing populated cities and towns during the Roman Empire.
 Old Maps of Anatolia - Antique maps showing names of historical places and geographical features.

Renamed
Lists of place names
Turkey
Renamed